= 2026 in the Philippines =

- Decades: 2000s; 2010s; 2020s
- See also: List of years in the Philippines; films; music; television; sports

The following is a list of events of the year 2026 in the Philippines, as well as predicted and scheduled events.

This year marks the country's chairmanship of the ASEAN, which will oversee a number of regional meetings including the ASEAN Summit.

== Incumbents ==
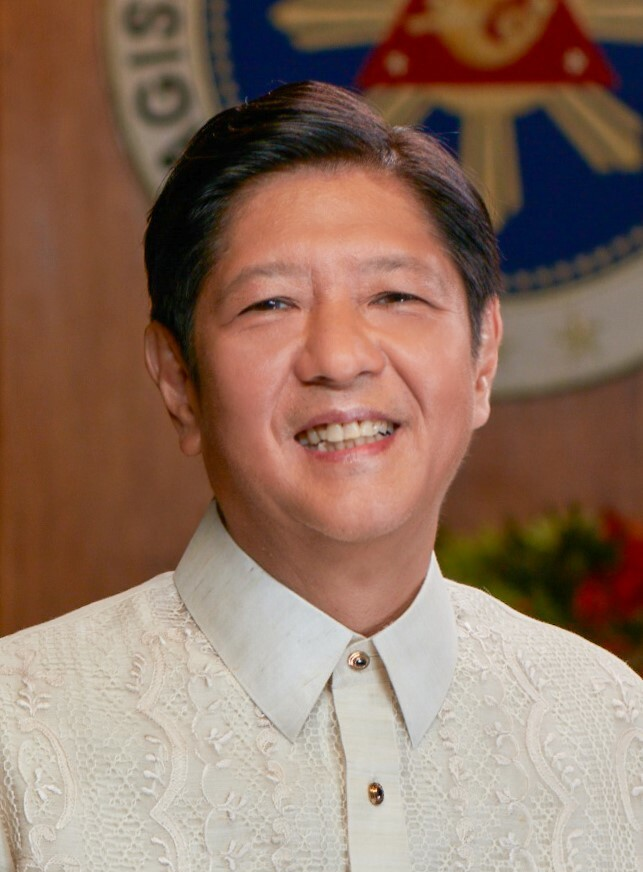
Bongbong Marcos

Sara Duterte

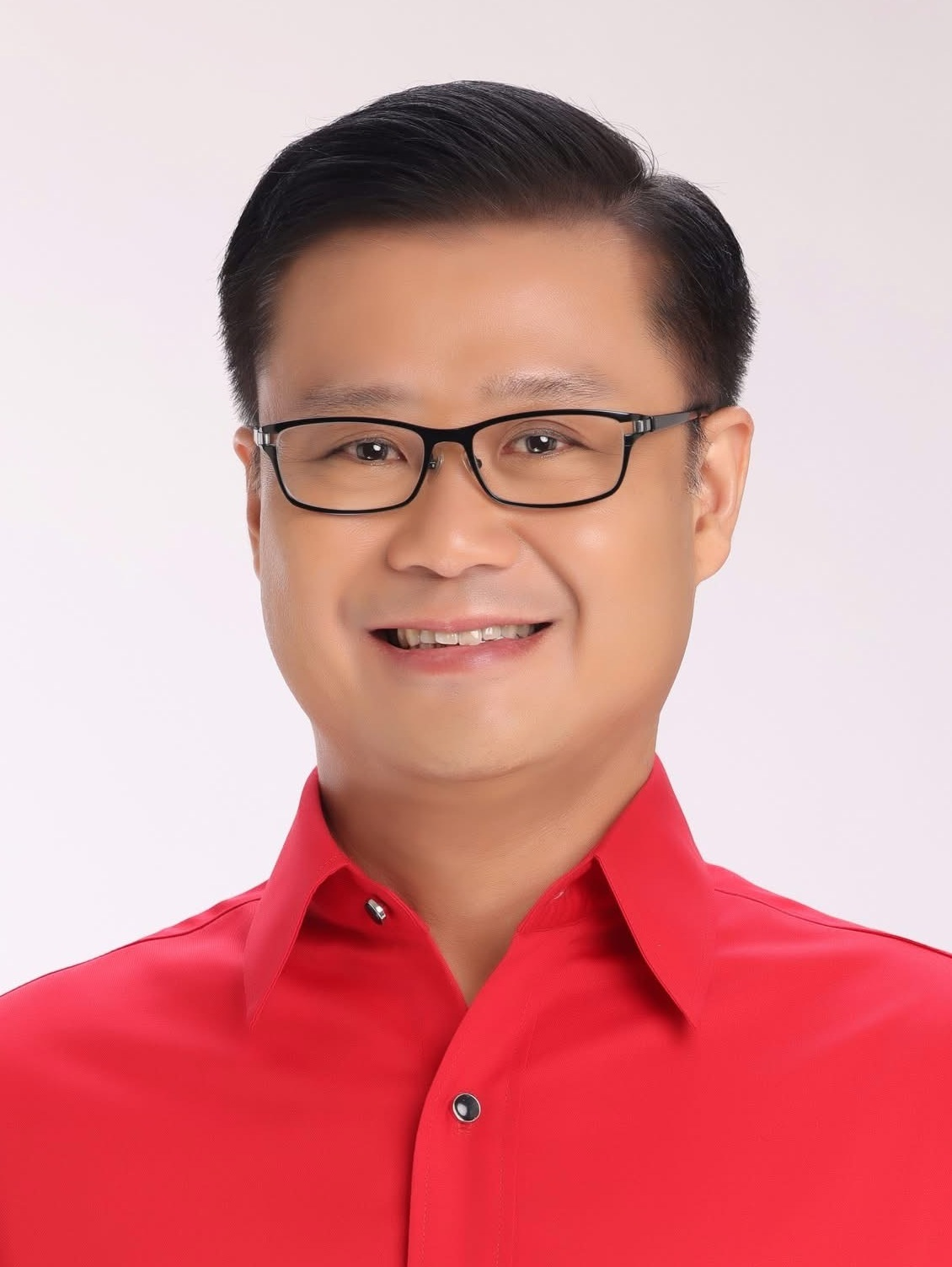
Sherwin Gatchalian

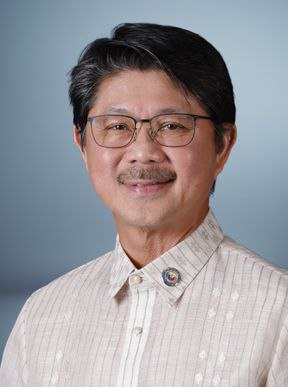
Bojie Dy

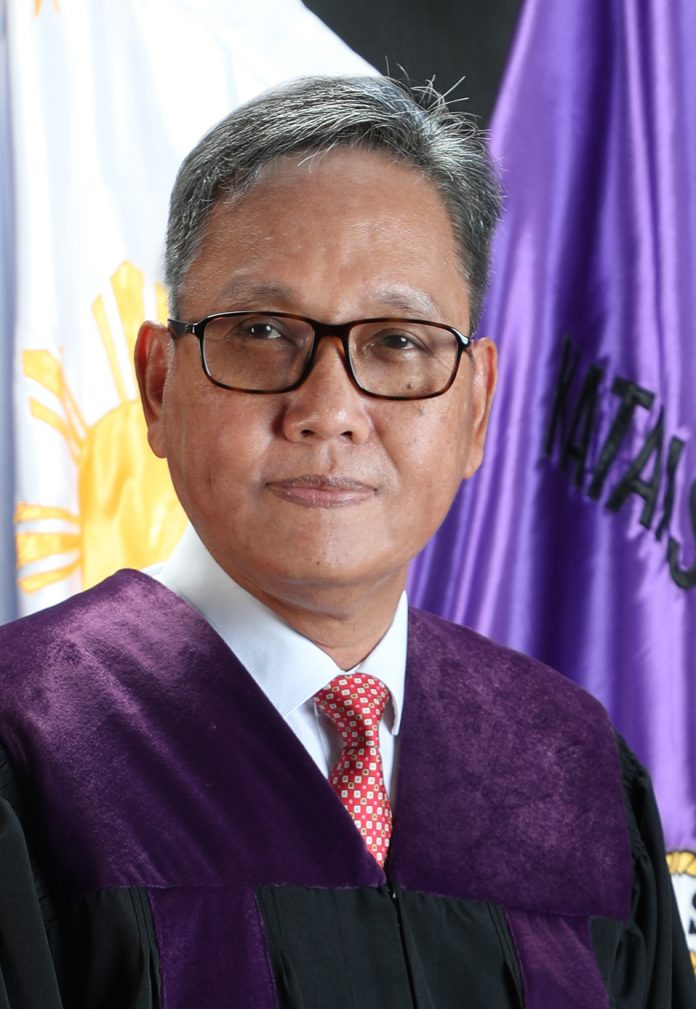
Rodil Zalameda

- President: Bongbong Marcos (PFP)
- Vice President: Sara Duterte (HNP)
- Senate President:
  - Vicente Sotto III (NPC) (until May 11)
  - Alan Peter Cayetano (Independent) (May 11 – June 17; disputed June 3–17)
  - Sherwin Gatchalian (NPC) (from June 17; acting June 3–17, disputed 3–17)
- House Speaker: Bojie Dy (PFP)
- Chief Justice:
  - Alexander Gesmundo (until November 6)
  - Rodil Zalameda (from November 6)
- Congress: 20th

== Ongoing events ==
- Energy crisis
- Flood control projects scandal
- Second impeachment of Sara Duterte
- International Criminal Court investigation

== Events ==
=== January ===
- January 2 – A ban on light electric vehicles from using major roads in Metro Manila is implemented. It was originally scheduled on December 1, 2025, and was supposed to be enforced nationwide.
- January 5 – Retired air force general Romeo Poquiz is arrested on charges of inciting to sedition in relation to a Facebook post criticizing the Marcos administration.
- January 6 – PHIVOLCS raises Alert Level 3 over Mayon volcano in Albay following a magmatic eruption. The status would remain until being lowered on August 5. On January 20, a state of calamity is declared in Tabaco, Albay as a result.
- January 8 – The Binaliw landfill in Cebu City collapses, destroying a building used by its employees. Thirty-six people are killed. On January 13, a state of calamity is declared in the city as a result.
- January 13 – Philippines–United Arab Emirates relations: A Comprehensive Economic Partnership Agreement is signed between the Philippines and the UAE during President Marcos' visit to Abu Dhabi, marking the first free trade agreement between the Philippines and a Middle Eastern country.
- January 14 – A court in Tuguegarao acquits political prisoner and peasant activist Amanda Echanis on charges of illegal possession of firearms and explosives.
- January 14 and 16 – Twenty-one individuals, including fourteen police officers (three have been in police custody), are arrested in a manhunt operation for gaming tycoon Atong Ang, accused mastermind in the disappearance of sabungeros particularly in the alleged abduction and killing of at least four in early 2022. Ang remains at large.
- January 15:
  - Japan–Philippines relations: The Philippines and Japan sign three bilateral agreements in Manila, including one allowing their defense forces to exchange logistical support—the second major defense accord following the implementation of the reciprocal access agreement in 2025; and another for funding of the new facilities of the Philippine Navy and the proposed wireless broadband connectivity for the Sulu Archipelago.
  - The Brave Pioneer, the Philippines’ first methanol dual-fueled bulk carrier ship, is inaugurated at the Tsuneishi Cebu Shipyard in Balamban, Cebu.
- January 16:
  - A court in Manila acquits former Negros Oriental representative Arnie Teves of murder over the 2019 killing of Negros Oriental Provincial Board member Michael Lopez Dungog.
  - The Department of Information and Communications Technology orders the blocking of Grok AI in the Philippines over its usage in generating illicit images of women and children.
- January 19:
  - President Marcos announces the discovery of an estimated 98,000,000,000 ft^{3} (2.8×10^{9} m^{3}) of gas reserves from the Malampaya East-1 field.
  - An impeachment complaint is filed in the House of Representatives against president Bongbong Marcos on charges related to the arrest of Rodrigo Duterte, his alleged drug use and involvement in the flood control scandal and issues over the national budget.
  - Former senator Bong Revilla surrenders to the Philippine National Police (PNP) after an arrest warrant is issued against him by the Sandiganbayan over the Flood control projects scandal.
  - The recreational boat MBCA Amejara, carrying 12 passengers and four crew members, capsizes in Davao Gulf off Davao Occidental, while on its way to Governor Generoso, Davao Oriental. Only a crewman is rescued; six of his companions are found dead.
- January 20 – Bangsamoro chief minister Abdulraof Macacua signs into law Bangsamoro Autonomy Act No. 86, restoring the number of single-member parliamentary districts in the Bangsamoro Parliament from 25 to 32 in response to the 2024 Supreme Court ruling that excluded Sulu from Bangsamoro.
- January 21 – Corey Dickpus, former vice mayor of Lubuagan, Kalinga, dies after a police encounter in his residence. He has been in the national most wanted list since 2001, being implicated in various criminal cases including a double murder in 2000 while serving as a barangay captain.
- January 22 – A court in Tacloban convicts community journalist Frenchie Mae Cumpio and lay worker Marielle Domequil of terrorism financing and acquits them for illegal possession of weapons. The two are part of the so-called "Tacloban 5" who were arrested in a joint law enforcement operation in 2020.
- January 23:
  - Dupax del Norte anti-mining protests: Seven protestors and one employee of Woggle Corporation are arrested while attempting to dismantle a barricade at an anti-mining protest in Dupax del Norte, Nueva Vizcaya.
  - The cargo vessel Devon Bay, with a Zamboanga City–Yangjiang route and carrying 21 Filipino sailors, capsizes in the South China Sea northwest of Scarborough Shoal; at least two sailors are killed while four others remain missing.
- January 26–30 – Events related to the beginning of country's chairmanship of the ASEAN are held in Metro Cebu, including the Tourism Forum (January 26–30) and the Foreign Ministers' Retreat (January 28–29), both held in Cebu City.
- January 26:
  - The ferry vessel M/V Trisha Kerstin 3 with a Zamboanga City–Jolo route sinks off Hadji Muhtamad, Basilan, killing at least 66 people and leaving 13 missing.
  - A second impeachment complaint is filed in the House of Representatives against President Marcos on charges of betrayal of public trust in the flood control scandal.
- January 28 – The Supreme Court votes, 13–0, to affirm its July 2025 ruling declaring the impeachment of vice president Duterte unconstitutional for violating a provision on the filing of complaints against the same official within a year, eventually dismissing an appeal from the House of Representatives.
- January 30:
  - The Sandiganbayan acquits former Misamis Oriental vice governor Jose Mari Go Pelaez of graft in a case involving the employment of three government employees in Pelaez's properties.
  - Police arrest three suspects in connection with the killings of a police officer and her son, whose bodies were found separately in Bulacan and Tarlac.

=== February ===
- February 2 – Two impeachment complaints are filed in the House of Representatives against vice president Sara Duterte on charges of betrayal of public trust in the usage of confidential funds.
- February 4:
  - The leadership of the House of Representatives announces the resignation as ACT-CIS Partylist representative of Edvic Yap, who has been linked to flood control projects controversy. He is replaced by Jeffrey Soriano, who is proclaimed by COMELEC on March 4.
  - The House of Representatives votes, 238–10 with nine abstentions, to suspend Cavite representative Kiko Barzaga, whose earlier suspension has ended on January 30, anew for 60 days due to his social media posts.
  - The Philippine House Committee on Justice dismisses the two impeachment complaints filed in January against President Marcos, citing insufficiency in substance.
  - A state of calamity is declared in Bongao, Tawi-Tawi due to a fire that destroys 1,000 houses.
- February 5 – The Supreme Court recognizes that cohabiting same-sex couples are entitled for recognition as co-owners of property if there is proof of actual contribution, in a case involving the disputed sale of a house and lot.
- February 6 and 9 – A state of calamity is declared in Iligan and Surigao del Sur due to damage caused by Tropical Storm Penha (Basyang). At least 12 people are killed due to the storm, while 36 others are injured.
- February 9 – A third impeachment complaint is filed in the House of Representatives against vice president Sara Duterte on charges of betrayal of public trust in the usage of confidential funds.
- February 10 – China imposes an entry ban on the entire municipal council of Kalayaan, Palawan, in response to the passage of resolutions declaring Chinese ambassador to the Philippines Jing Quan and his predecessor, Huang Xilian, persona non grata.
- February 12 – A Mongolian national is arrested on suspicion of spying on sensitive locations in Iba, Zambales.
- February 13 – The International Criminal Court identifies eight individuals, namely senators Bong Go and Ronald dela Rosa, former PNP chiefs Vicente Danao, Camilo Cascolan and Oscar Albayalde, former National Bureau of Investigation chief Dante Gierran, former Philippine Drug Enforcement Agency chief Isidro Lapeña and former justice secretary Vitaliano Aguirre II as indirect co-perpetrators in the crimes against humanity case against former president Rodrigo Duterte during the Philippine drug war.
- February 17–18 – A power outage occurs for almost 27 hours in Cotabato City, Maguindanao del Norte, Maguindanao del Sur, the Special Geographic Area of the Bangsamoro, and six municipalities in Cotabato; caused by a cut conductor in a transmission tower in Pikit.
- February 18 – A fourth impeachment complaint is filed in the House of Representatives against vice president Sara Duterte on charges of betrayal of public trust and violation of the constitution in the usage of confidential funds and issuing threats against president Marcos.
- February 24 – A US military aircraft collides with a concrete barrier along a road in Laoac, Pangasinan, while undergoing contingency training, injuring its five crew and damaging the aircraft.
- February 25 – A state of calamity is declared in San Jose del Monte, Bulacan due to a water shortage blamed on mismanagement by water utility firm PrimeWater that affects 47,611 households.

=== March ===
- March 10 – A state of calamity is declared in Isabela due to agricultural damage caused by drought. With the status remaining even at the start of the El Niño phenomenon, the province would be the first in both the Cagayan Valley region and in the country to be placed under such.
- March 12 – The Sandiganbayan acquits former Isabela State University president Aleth Misola Mamauag of graft in a case involving the university's purchase of property in Quezon City in 2012 valued at P6.2 million.
- March 13 – The Cebu Bus Rapid Transit System begins operations.
- March 14 – A special election is held in the 2nd district of Antipolo to select a new member of the House of Representatives following the death of Romeo Acop in December 2025. Acop's son, Bong, is proclaimed the winner the following day, defeating five independent candidates, and sworn into office on March 16.
- March 17 – The Sandiganbayan dismisses a case of the Coco Levy Fund scam filed in 1987 against former president Ferdinand Marcos, former first lady Imelda Marcos and United Coconut Planters Bank board members Juan Ponce Enrile and Maria Clara Lobregat, citing inordinate delay.
- March 19:
  - Bagong Alyansang Makabayan and PISTON hold a nationwide transportation strike in protest against rising fuel prices.
  - The Sandiganbayan dismisses a forfeiture case filed against former Leyte governor Benjamin Romualdez and his wife involving more than US$5 million in alleged unexplained wealth held in Swiss bank accounts, citing the previous dismissal of a similar case in 2025.
- March 23 – A state of calamity is declared in Sorsogon due to damage caused by the 2026 Philippine energy crisis.
- March 24 – President Marcos issues Executive Order No. 110, declaring a state of national energy emergency, which would be effective within a year, citing risks to the country's energy supply due to the Middle East conflict.
- March 25:
  - President Marcos signs Republic Act No. 12316, authorizing him to suspend or reduce excise taxes on fuel, in relation to the 2026 Philippine energy crisis.
  - President Marcos signs Republic Act No. 12317, resetting the first regular elections for the Bangsamoro Parliament to the second Monday of September; setting the term period for the elected officials from October 30 to June 30, 2031; and synchronizing the elections with those being held nationwide every three years, starting in 2031. (Note: On October 1, 2025, the Supreme Court issued an order postponing the first election for the Bangsamoro Parliament, which was scheduled on October 13. The election was later rescheduled to March 30, 2026; however, on January 28, it was deferred by the Commission on Elections due to delays caused by the passage of the law reallocating parliamentary seats following the exclusion of Sulu from Bangsamoro.)
- March 26–27: The No to Oil Price Hike coalition holds a nationwide transportation strike in protest against rising fuel prices.
- March 26:
  - President Marcos issues Executive Order No. 111, giving Philippine names to 131 features in the Kalayaan Island Group.
  - (CET) France–Philippines relations: The governments of the Philippines and France sign the former's first visiting forces agreement with a European country in a bilateral meeting at the École Militaire in Paris.
- March 30 – Philtranco, the country's oldest bus operator, ceases operations due to financial losses.
- March 31:
  - The Independent Commission for Infrastructure ceases operations, citing fulfillment of its mandate to investigate flood control anomalies.
  - The Supreme Court publicizes its November 2025 decision which, by denying separate petitions by media companies GMA Network and ABS-CBN, upholds the ruling dismissing a complaint filed by the former regarding statements by ABS-CBN in 2007 alleging the manipulation by GMA of television ratings surveys.
  - A state of calamity is declared in Ajuy, Iloilo due to damage caused by the energy crisis.

=== April ===
- April 1:
  - A state of local emergency is declared in Bongao, Tawi-Tawi, due to fuel shortages caused by the shutdown of the municipality's two gasoline stations.
  - A state of calamity is declared in New Lucena, Iloilo, due to damage caused by the energy crisis.
- April 2:
  - The Supreme Court announces its January 20 resolution which, by granting the Solicitor General's withdrawal of its motion for extension to file a petition for review in September 2025, terminates the case involving the shutdown of online news website Rappler, thus upholding an earlier decision by the Court of Appeals nullifying the 2018 revocation by the Securities and Exchange Commission of its certificates of incorporation.
  - Iran–Philippines relations: Foreign affairs secretary Tess Lazaro announces that Philippine vessels, energy sources, and seafarers will be granted safe passage through the Strait of Hormuz by Iran amid the 2026 Iran war, following a phone call with Iranian foreign minister Abbas Araghchi.
- April 7:
  - A state of energy emergency is declared in Cagayan de Oro due to the ongoing fuel crisis.
  - A state of calamity is declared in Baguio due to the ongoing fuel crisis.
- April 8 – A state of calamity is declared in Zamboanga City due to the ongoing fuel crisis.
- April 10 – A fire breaks out at the Navotas Sanitary Landfill, an abandoned offshore dumpsite, affecting around 90% of the area as of late April. The fire continues with the smoke reaching as far as Bataan, and causes evacuations in Obando, Bulacan, where one dies from toxic fumes in one of the country's worst environmental disasters.
- April 11 – A plebiscite to rename the town of San Isidro in Davao del Norte to Sawata passes with the approval of 98.94% of voters.
- April 12 – The RAGE Coalition is formed at Club Filipino in San Juan with Sebastian Duterte, mayor of Davao City and newly-appointed president of PDP, named as its central convenor.
- April 13 and 16 – President Marcos announces the removal of excise tax on liquefied petroleum gas and kerosene by the virtue of Republic Act No. 12316. Three days later, Marcos issues Executive Order No. 114 in relation to the order that would last for three months.
- April 15–17 – Manibela holds a nationwide transportation strike in protest against rising fuel prices.
- April 16:
  - Former Ako Bicol partylist representative Zaldy Co, who is wanted on charges relating to the flood control scandal, is detained in Prague, Czech Republic, following a travel violation after being stopped at the Czech Republic–Germany border in his attempt to enter Germany. Co is later released and is reported to be still within the Schengen Area.
  - The Philippines officially joins the United States-led Pax Silica initiative.
- April 17 – Ten members of the Dawlah Islamiya–Maute Group, involved in the 2017 Marawi siege, are killed in a joint law enforcement operation in Marantao, Lanao del Sur.
- April 19 – Nineteen suspected members of the New People's Army are killed in encounters with the military in Toboso, Negros Occidental.
- April 20:
  - Philippines–United States relations: The largest, 19-day annual Balikatan exercise by the American and Philippine militaries begins, being held in northern and western coasts of Luzon and joined by contingents from Australia, Canada, France, Japan (for the first time), and New Zealand.
  - A state of calamity is declared in Cagayan due to drought and the ongoing fuel crisis. The status remains even at the start of El Niño, and the province would be the Cagayan Valley's second to be placed under such.
- April 21–23 – Transport groups Manibela and Piston stage another nationwide transportation strike in relation to high fuel prices.
- April 22 – A state of calamity is declared in Calanasan, Apayao, due to the ongoing energy crisis.
- April 28 – A state of calamity is declared in Paracelis, Mountain Province, due to drought, water shortage, and the ongoing energy crisis. With the status remaining even at the start of El Niño, the municipality would be the Cordillera Administrative Region's first to be placed under such, and is later followed by Pudtol, Apayao.

=== May ===
- May 2 – The Supreme Court overturns the dismissal of deputy ombudsman Melchor Arthur Carandang by the Duterte administration in 2018, citing lack of authority by the Office of the President.
- May 4 – The Cebu Provincial Board lifts the province-wide state of calamity which has been in effect since 2025 following an earthquake and typhoon Kalmaegi (Tino).
- May 5:
  - A state of calamity is declared in three cities (Legazpi, Ligao and Tabaco) and five municipalities (Camalig, Malilipot, Santo Domingo, Daraga, and Guinobatan) of Albay following a pyroclastic flow from Mayon volcano on May 2.
  - Philippines–United States relations: During the annual Balikatan, the United States' Typhon missile system is fired in the country for the first time, launching from Tacloban Airport in Leyte a Tomahawk missile which strikes its target at Fort Magsaysay in Laur, Nueva Ecija, 630 km (390 mi) away.
  - Five individuals, including Peanut Gallery Media Network founder Franco Mabanta, are arrested by the National Bureau of Investigation (NBI) in Pasig over an alleged extortion targeting former House speaker Martin Romualdez.
- May 6–8 – The 48th ASEAN Summit and Related Meetings are held in Lapu-Lapu City. Four documents are signed during the summit held on May 8, including the "Cebu Protocol," the first amendment to the ASEAN Charter.
- May 10 – The Navotas landfill fire is declared extinguished by President Marcos.
- May 11–14 – A standoff occurs at the Senate as the NBI attempts to serve an ICC arrest warrant, issued in late 2025 and made public, against senator Ronald dela Rosa in connection to president Duterte's drug war. Tensions escalate two days later when gunshots are heard in the area and an NBI driver is arrested. On May 14, dela Rosa leaves the Senate complex.
- May 11:
  - Second impeachment of Sara Duterte: The House of Representatives votes, 257-25 with nine abstentions, to impeach Vice President Duterte for the second time. On May 13, the impeachment case is transmitted to the Senate for trial.
  - Paraguay–Philippines relations: The governments of the Philippines and Paraguay sign agreements on diplomatic training and on waiving visa requirements for ordinary passport holders, during Paraguayan President Santiago Peña's visit to Manila, the first presidential visit since the beginning of diplomatic relations in 1962.
- May 14 – Bangsamoro interim Chief Minister Abdulraof Macacua issues a proclamation declaring a region-wide state of calamity due to the ongoing oil crisis and dry spell. With the El Niño phenomenon beginning, the region would be the country's first to be placed under such.
- May 18:
  - The Senate convenes as a court for the impeachment trial of Sara Duterte.
  - 1Tahanan party-list representative Nat Oducado and Pinoy Workers Partylist representative Franz Legazpi resign from the House of Representatives. Legazpi is replaced by Karl Legazpi on May 20; while Oducado is replaced by Elmer Catulpos on May 28.
- May 20 – An SF-260 trainer aircraft of the Philippine Air Force crashes in Tuba, Benguet, killing the two pilots.
- May 24 – A nine-story building under construction collapses in Angeles City, killing 30 people including a Malaysian citizen.
- May 29 – Gawad Kalinga founder Tony Meloto is arrested in Angat, Bulacan, on charges of sex trafficking.

=== June ===
- June 1 – Senator Jinggoy Estrada is arrested by the PNP after an arrest warrant is issued against him by the Sandiganbayan over the flood control projects scandal.
- June 2:
  - The House of Representatives votes, 265–14 with eight abstentions, to expel Cavite 4th district representative Kiko Barzaga due to "disorderly behavior."
  - The Sandiganbayan, in a resolution, dismisses the remaining asset claims in the forfeiture case against the Marcos family in relation to their alleged ill-gotten wealth, as the Presidential Commission on Good Government opts not to present further evidence.
- June 3 (ET) – Philippines and the United Nations: The Philippines loses the election for a two-year non-permanent seat on the UN Security Council to Kyrgyzstan.
- June 4, 12, and 18 – The regions of Cagayan Valley, Calabarzon, Caraga and Cordillera, respectively, are declared free from insurgency by their peace and order councils.
- June 5 – The Sandiganbayan acquits former Philippine Reclamation Authority chair Alberto Agra on charges of graft involving bias alleged preference in undertaking contracts for a reclamation project in Bacoor, Cavite in 2021, citing insufficient evidence.
- June 8:
  - A magnitude 7.8 earthquake with epicenter off Maasim, Sarangani, hits Mindanao, killing 92 people and leaving 20 others missing; with damages surpassing ₱2 billion in four regions. A state of calamity is subsequently declared in the provinces of Davao Occidental, Sarangani and South Cotabato, and in the city of General Santos.
  - The academic year 2026–2027 begins under a new three-term calendar.
  - Contractor Curlee Discaya is arrested by authorities in the Senate over charges related to a flood control project in Calumpit, Bulacan. He is then brought to the Bulacan Provincial Jail after being detained at the Senate for more than nine months.
- June 9 – The Criminal Investigation and Detection Group arrests dismissed police officer Rafael Dumlao III, who was convicted of masterminding the 2016 killing of Jee Ick-joo, in Quezon City.
- June 11 – China–Philippines relations: China imposes sanctions and an entry ban on defense secretary Gilbert Teodoro, his wife Monica, and their son, citing statements made against the country.
- June 15 – A state of calamity is declared in Puerto Galera, Oriental Mindoro, due to water shortages caused by a dry spell. The municipality is the Mimaropa's first to be placed under such due to El Niño.
- June 16:
  - The Sandiganbayan orders the 90-day preventive suspension of Senator Jinggoy Estrada in relation to charges of graft.
  - Seven students are injured in a school stabbing in General Trias, Cavite.
- June 17 – Sherwin Gatchalian is elected as the Senate president, ending a leadership dispute with Alan Peter Cayetano who conceded the same position earlier that day. The dispute began on June 3 when Gatchalian, then president pro tempore, was designated as acting president during a quorum initiated by the minority bloc of eleven and Francis Escudero to end a three-day deadlock where Cayetano's majority was involved.
- June 20 – Philippines–Russia relations: The national government announces the release of 24 Filipino nationals after a nine-month detention in Irkutsk in Siberia, following a meeting between President Marcos and Russian president Vladimir Putin in Kazan, Russia. The Filipinos are later repatriated to the country until June 21.
- June 22 – Three students are killed while 20 others are injured in a mass shooting at a secondary school in Tacloban. Two suspects, both minors and also students, are arrested thereafter.
- June 29 – A state of calamity is declared in Alegria, Cebu, due to water shortages in three barangays.
- June 30:
  - The Iglesia ni Cristo (INC) organizes surprise rallies in the cities of Manila, Quezon and San Juan, attended by an estimated 15,000 people to support senator and INC member Rodante Marcoleta who is then under investigation for plunder. At the People Power Monument in Quezon City, five people are arrested following an altercation. The rally continues until being moved to Manila on its conclusion on July 2.
  - The provincial government of Negros Occidental declares the continuation of the province-wide state of calamity, which has been in effect since 2025 due to Tropical Storm Wipha (Crising) and the infestation of the red-striped soft scale insect (RSSI) that is affecting sugarcane plantations to date.

=== July ===
- July 1 – The Philippines reaches upper middle income status according to the World Bank.
- July 2 (PT) – Canada–Philippines relations: President Marcos and Canadian prime minister Mark Carney agree to upgrade bilateral relations to a strategic partnership during the former's official visit to Vancouver, Canada.
- July 6:
  - Senator Marcoleta and three co-accused, including former Anakalusugan representative Mike Defensor, are separately arrested in Quezon City after the Sandiganbayan issues an arrest warrant against them for plunder.
  - The impeachment trial for vice president Duterte begins at the Senate.
  - A state of calamity is declared in Batac, Ilocos Norte, following a massive fire that destroys the city's public market on July 5–6.
- July 11:
  - A state of calamity is declared in Calanogas, Lanao del Sur following landslides that leave seven people dead and four others missing following heavy rains brought by Typhoon Bavi (Super Typhoon Inday). At least 23 people are killed due to the storm nationwide, while eight others are injured and 18 are reported missing.
  - A state of calamity is declared in Bagulin, La Union due to an outbreak of dengue that results in 251 cases in the town.
- July 14:
  - A state of calamity is declared in Pototan, Iloilo, due to flooding caused by the southwest monsoon (habagat).
  - The first phase of the 3,500 ha (8,600 acres) Meralco Terra (MTerra) Solar Project, the world's largest solar power plant, is inaugurated in Gapan, Nueva Ecija.
- July 19–24 – A series of ASEAN-related events are held in Metro Manila—the 59th Foreign Ministers' Meeting and related meetings (July 20–23) which include the Post-Ministerial Conference (July 22), the 33rd ASEAN Regional Forum and the 16th East Asia Summit meetings (July 23); and the commemoration of the 50th anniversary of the Treaty of Amity and Cooperation in Southeast Asia (July 24), during which the instruments of accession to the treaty are signed by Lithuania, Poland, Romania and Sweden.
- July 20:
  - A state of calamity is declared in Negros Oriental due to the ongoing infestation of the RSSI, affecting sugarcane fields. The same declaration is made in Bais earlier this month.
  - An officer of the Philippine Navy is injured after being struck with a baton by China Coast Guard personnel during a confrontation at Second Thomas Shoal in the South China Sea.
- July 22–24 – Manibela holds a nationwide transportation strike in protest against rising fuel prices.
- July 22 – The Ombudsman issues (and later publicizes) its decision, dated December 1, 2025, to impose a three-month suspension for Narra, Palawan mayor Gerandy Danao in relation to a case of simple misconduct filed in 2024.
- July 24:
  - The Sandiganbayan convicts businesswoman Janet Lim-Napoles of malversation of public funds through falsification of public documents and graft in connection with non-existent projects for farmers in Luzon. Former agrarian reform undersecretary Jerry Pacturan and Napoles' former staff are likewise convicted as the former is acquitted of graft.
  - The United States imposes a 12.5% tariff on Philippine exports, citing the alleged presence of forced labor in the supply chain.
- July 25 – A majority of participating voters in five coastal barangays of Parañaque ratify in a plebiscite a city ordinance altering their territorial boundaries, redistributing the reclaimed areas in Manila Bay in effect.

=== August ===
- Early August – The Supreme Court upholds the conviction by the Sandiganbayan of Nicanor and Pacita de Leon, former mayors of Amulung, Cagayan, who have been given six-year prison sentences for graft and corruption.
- August 4 – A state of calamity is declared in Buluan, Maguindanao del Sur, due to widespread flooding caused by continuous rains beginning July 23 and the overflowing of the Buluan River.
- August 5 and 10 – A state of calamity is declared in Bacolod and Capiz, respectively, due to the RSSI infestation on sugarcane fields.
- August 10 – September 1 – A state of calamity is declared in the provinces of Bataan, Benguet, Bulacan, Cavite, Occidental Mindoro, Pampanga, Pangasinan, Tarlac and Zambales, the cities of Angeles, Dagupan and Olongapo, and in parts of Manila, Batangas and Rizal due to the impact of the habagat (southwest monsoon) and four tropical cyclones. (Note: Tropical storm Kujiri (Luis and Maymay), Tropical depression Neneng, Typhoon Saudel (Obet), and Tropical storm Krovanh (Pilandok).) At least 44 people are reported killed nationwide in incidents caused by the said weather systems; while five others are reported missing. Damages are estimated at ₱12.6 billion.
- August 18:
  - Two students, including the gunman, are killed while more than 20 others are injured in a mass shooting at the Ateneo de Zamboanga Junior High School in Zamboanga City.
  - President Marcos signs Executive Order (EO) No. 123 which reverts the administrative supervision over the Presidential Commission for the Urban Poor and the National Anti-Poverty Commission from the Department of Social Welfare and Development to the Office of the President, partially reversing EO No. 67 of 2018.
  - A state of calamity is declared in La Trinidad, Benguet, due to the effects of southwest monsoon, tropical cyclones, and the African swine fever virus.
- August 21 – Bimmy Alonto, the vice mayor of Marantao, Lanao del Sur, is arrested in Iligan on charges of murder and frustrated murder.
- August 22 – Japan–Philippines relations: The Acquisition and Cross-Servicing Agreement between the Philippines and Japan, whose main agreement was signed in January, enters into force.
- August 25 – The Urology Center of the Philippines, Inc. in Quezon City conducts the country's first remote surgery from Shanghai, China.
- August 26 – A state of calamity is declared in Dinagat Islands due to drought and water shortage. The province is the Caraga region's first to be placed under such due to El Niño.
- August 28 – A state of calamity is declared in Guinayangan, Quezon, due to drought and the resulting water shortage. The municipality is the Calabarzon's first to be placed under such due to El Niño, and is later followed by Alabat, General Nakar, Jomalig and Lopez.
- August 29 – A special election for a member of the House of Representatives in the 4th district of Cavite is held. Incumbent Dasmariñas mayor Jenny Barzaga, mother of expelled representative Kiko, is elected replacing the latter, and is sworn into office on September 1.

=== September ===
- September 4:
  - President Marcos signs into law Republic Act No. 12325, amending the Universal Access to Quality Tertiary Education Act and increasing government assistance to tertiary education students.
  - A court in Quezon City issues an arrest warrant against vice president Duterte on charges of grave threats regarding statements she made in 2024 against President Marcos, First Lady Liza Araneta-Marcos, and then House Speaker Martin Romualdez. Duterte posts bail the following day.
- September 5 and 24 – In Caraga region, a state of calamity is declared in the city of Butuan and the province of Agusan del Sur, respectively, due to the impact of prolonged drought and water shortages caused by El Niño. In the municipal level, the same is likewise declared recently in Las Nieves in Agusan del Norte, and Carmen and Lanuza in Surigao del Sur.
- September 7 – Former House speaker Martin Romualdez is arrested while seeking medical treatment at the Cardinal Santos Medical Center in San Juan, Metro Manila on charges of plunder relating to the flood control scandal.
- September 8, 10 and 28 – In the Bicol Region, a state of calamity is declared in the city of Naga and the provinces of Albay and Camarines Sur, respectively, due to the outbreaks of dengue that have killed more than thirty people.
- September 9:
  - The Supreme Court publicizes its decision dated June 10 acquitting former first lady Imelda Marcos by overturning her 2018 conviction by the Sandiganbayan of seven of ten counts of graft which were filed in 1991 in relation to Swiss foundations.
  - The passenger vessel MV June Aster sailing from Manila catches fire before reaching Coron, Palawan, killing at least 77 people and leaving eight others missing.
- September 14–15 – Manibela holds a nationwide transportation strike in protest against rising fuel prices.
- September 14 – The first election for the Bangsamoro Parliament is held. The winners are proclaimed within the next two days with the Bangsamoro Federalist Party securing a plurality of seats, while the United Bangsamoro Justice Party wins all six sectoral seats.
- September 16 – The Supreme Court rules that Congress has a mandatory duty to pass a law to ban political dynasties in the country under the Constitution following a consolidated petition submitted by civic groups.
- September 18:
  - Three students are killed ‌while eight others are injured in a mass shooting at a secondary school in Banga, South Cotabato.
  - The Ombudsman orders the dismissal of Duero, Bohol mayor Al Taculad, citing conflict of interest in the awarding of P79.33 million in government infrastructure projects in the municipality in 2023.
  - The BFAR vessel BRP Datu Magat Salamat is damaged after being struck by a China Coast Guard vessel in the South China Sea off the coast of Palawan.
  - A state of calamity is declared in Camarines Norte due to the water shortage. The province is the Bicol Region's first to be placed under such due to El Niño. Similar declarations are made earlier in the municipalities of San Lorenzo Ruiz and San Vicente.
- September 21 – The Sandiganbayan imposes a 90-day preventive suspension on Uswag Ilonggo party-list representative Jojo Ang after he is charged with graft over alleged conflict of interest in infrastructure projects.
- September 23–24 – The Department of Information and Communications Technology imposes a ban on Discord in the country, citing security reasons. The ban is subsequently lifted amid heavy criticism from users.
- September 23 – The Padre Pio Shrine in Santo Tomas, Batangas, is declared an international shrine, the country's second, following its designation by the Holy See in Vatican City on May 25.
- September 24:
  - President Marcos signs into law Republic Act No. 12326, amending RA No. 12232. In effect, the barangay and Sangguniang Kabataan elections, scheduled on November 2, are postponed to the second Monday of November 2028; and the terms of officials are set to five years. (Note: On August 13, 2025, President Marcos signed into law Republic Act No. 12232 which moved the scheduled date of the barangay and Sangguniang Kabataan elections from December 1, 2025, to November 2, 2026.)
  - President Marcos grants absolute pardon to Mary Jane Veloso, who had been imprisoned since 2010 for heroin smuggling in Indonesia, was reprieved from execution in 2015 and sent back to the country in 2024. She is released from the Correctional Institution for Women in Mandaluyong the following day.
- September 25 – President Marcos issues Executive Order No. 125, suspending anew excise taxes on liquefied petroleum gas and kerosene.
- September 28–30 – Manibela and Piston hold a nationwide transportation strike in protest against rising fuel prices.

=== October ===
- October 1 – In Luang Prabang, Laos, a drug smuggling scheme is thwarted by Laotian police at Luang Prabang International Airport involving a private jet from Malaysia planning to transport methamphetamine to the Philippines. This leads to a joint investigation by authorities in Malaysia and the Philippines after a Filipino politician is suspected to have been involved.
- October 6 – A state of calamity is declared in Dueñas, Iloilo, due to agricultural damages caused by the RSSI infestation and a dry spell. The municipality is the Western Visayas' first to be placed under such due to El Niño; and is later followed by Lambunao.
- October 7 – A state of calamity is declared in Lope de Vega, Northern Samar, due to the impact of prolonged drought. The municipality is the Eastern Visayas' first to be placed under such due to El Niño; and is later followed by Gandara, Samar.
- October 12 – The Sandiganbayan orders another 90-day preventive suspension of Senator Jinggoy Estrada in relation to charges of graft.
- October 13 – The Sandiganbayan acquits former health secretary Janette Garin of graft involving P3 billion used in the procurement of Dengvaxia vaccines and the school-based immunization program.
- October 14 – The Philippine Competition Commission imposes a fine of P1.76 billion pesos ($27.9 million) on six companies for forming a cartel that artificially raised the price of onions in 2022, making it the largest penalty imposed by the agency since its establishment in 2016.
- October 15 – A state of calamity is declared in Iloilo due to the RSSI infestation on sugarcane fields. Similar declarations are made earlier in Dueñas, Passi and San Enrique.
- October 19 – The Sandiganbayan orders a 90-day suspension of Senator Rodante Marcoleta due to his plunder case.
- October 20 – The Supreme Court, acting on four separate petitions, declares unconstitutional the 2024 and 2025 General Appropriations Acts and certain provisions in the 2026 GAA, citing adjustments made by the Congress involving the unprogrammed and special funds. However, the SC declares the application of the doctrine of operative fact (recognition of the validity of a law prior to the decision) in its decision on the first two GAAs.
- October 23 – Two SF-260 trainer aircraft of the Philippine Air Force crash after colliding with each other mid-air over Fernando Air Base in Lipa, Batangas, killing four pilots.
- October 28 – President Marcos issues Executive Order No. 130 allowing the independent suspension of in-person classes in schools based on any threats, and resumption of such while disregarding any existing suspension order from the local government.
- October 30:
  - The Supreme Court publicizes its February 4 ruling emphasizing that men can also be victims of sexual violence, in a 2018 case where a woman was later convicted.
  - PHIVOLCS raises anew Alert Level 3 over Mayon volcano in Albay following a six-minute moderately explosive eruption.
  - Abdulraof Macacua, the incumbent interim chief minister of Bangsamoro, becomes the first to be elected for the same position by the first regular regional parliament during their inaugural session.
- Late October – A state of calamity is declared in Lamut, Ifugao, due to an outbreak of African swine fever.

=== November ===
- Mid-November – The Supreme Court publicizes an August 12 resolution nullifying a decision that found retired PC/Supt. (Note: Police chief superintendent, equivalent to present-day police brigadier general (PBGen.).) Bernardo Diaz, former regional police director in Western Visayas accused of drug crimes by former president Duterte in 2016, liable in an administrative case, and his ultimate dismissal citing violation of the right to due process.
- November 4 – The effectivity of a previous year's proclamation declaring a state of national calamity for a year due to the effects of Typhoon Kalmaegi (Tino) ends.
- November 8 – Former Sultan Kudarat representative Arnulfo Go, who has facing charges of malversation of public funds and corruption, surrenders to the police in General Santos.
- November 10 – The Sandiganbayan orders a 90-day preventive suspension of Leyte representative Martin Romualdez in relation to charges of plunder.
- November 11 – A state of calamity is declared in Santa Maria, Ilocos Sur, due to the effects of prolonged drought. The municipality is the Ilocos Region's first to be placed under such due to El Niño.
- November 12:
  - Slovakia opens its first resident embassy in Manila, 33 years after establishing diplomatic relations with the Philippines.
  - Basilan becomes the first province in Bangsamoro (already under a region-wide status) to be placed under a state of calamity due to El Niño.
- November 13:
  - Brazil–Philippines relations: Brazilian president Luiz Inácio Lula da Silva begins his state visit to the Philippines, becoming the first sitting Brazilian president to visit the country.
  - The Sandiganbayan acquits former Albay governor Edcel Greco Lagman of indirect bribery and violations of the anti-jueteng law, citing insufficient evidence.
- November 14 – In a ceremony in Manila hosted by the Department of Foreign Affairs, the instruments of accession to the ASEAN's Treaty of Amity and Cooperation in Southeast Asia are signed by Cyprus, Slovakia and Slovenia, bringing the number of countries that had joined the treaty to 65.
- November 15–17 – The 49th ASEAN Summit and related meetings are held in Pasay, particularly at the Philippine International Convention Center. More than 150 documents are adopted including those on digital economy and energy cooperation.
- November 15 – Australia–Philippines relations: The Philippines and Australia sign an upgraded defense agreement in Manila.
- November 17 – A state of calamity is declared in Bohol due to agricultural damages caused by prolonged dry spell. The province is the Central Visayas' first to be placed under such due to El Niño.
- November 18 – The National Telecommunications Commission releases an order rescheduling the completion of analog television switch-off for Mega Manila, initially set on November 22, this year, on January 15, 2027. The shutdown would begin the transition of the country's television broadcast to digital. (Note: The initial analog television switch-off in entire Mega Manila, which would commence the nationwide transition to digital TV broadcasting, is originally scheduled on November 22 according to an NTC order in November 2025.)
- November 19 – Chile–Philippines relations: The Philippines and Chile sign a Comprehensive Economic Partnership Agreement during the Asia-Pacific Economic Cooperation meetings in Shenzhen, China, marking the country's first such agreement with a Latin American country.
- November 21 – A majority of participating voters ratify the conversion of Naga, an independent component city in Camarines Sur, into a highly urbanized city, in a city-wide plebiscite held in accordance with Proclamation No. 1267 issued on May 26.

=== Predicted and scheduled ===
- November 28 – A special election will be held in the lone district of Batanes to select a new member of the House of Representatives following the death of Jun Gato in September.
- November 30 – The International Criminal Court (ICC) will begin the trial on three counts of crimes against humanity against former President Rodrigo Duterte, who would be the first Asian former head of state to face such trial, in connection with his war on drugs following the ICC's rejection of his challenge to the court's jurisdiction, and the confirmation of all charges against him in late April.
- Between December 16 and 25 – The target date on a possible verdict in the impeachment trial of vice president Duterte, despite no final date yet. Three of the four charges against her have been dropped by the House prosecution, leaving that of alleged unexplained wealth.
- December – The Cavite–Laguna Expressway, whose subsections from General Trias to Kawit in Cavite are to be finished, and the CAVITEX–CALAX Link in Kawit, will be fully operational.

==== Date unknown ====
- Construction of the New Manila International Airport in Bulacan will begin.
- The Cavite Bus Rapid Transit System will commence partial operations from Makati to Imus.
- The first solar-powered podcar transport system in Southeast Asia will start its operations in Ilagan, Isabela.
- The MRT-3 will be handed over by the Metro Rail Transit Corporation to the national government upon the end of its build-lease-transfer contract.
- The status of Pagadian, Zamboanga del Sur, as a highly urbanized city will be determined, pending a plebiscite in accordance with Proclamation No. 1247.
- The Runruno mine in Nueva Vizcaya will cease operations.

== Holidays ==
On September 3, 2025, the national government issues Proclamation No. 1006 providing the list of regular and special non-working holidays for 2026.

Compared to previous year, All Souls' Day, last observed in 2024 as an additional special (non-working) day, is included again in the list; while a day prior to All Saints' Day (October 31) is excluded.

=== Regular ===
- January 1 – New Year's Day
- March 20 – Eid'l Fitr
- April 2 – Maundy Thursday
- April 3 – Good Friday
- April 9 – Araw ng Kagitingan (Day of Valor)
- May 1 – Labor Day
- May 27 – EId'l Adha
- June 12 – Independence Day
- August 31 – National Heroes Day
- November 30 – Bonifacio Day
- December 25 – Christmas Day
- December 30 – Rizal Day

=== Special (Non-working) days ===
- February 17 – Chinese New Year
- April 4 – Black Saturday
- August 21 – Ninoy Aquino Day
- November 1 – All Saints Day
- November 2 – All Souls Day
- December 8 – Feast of the Immaculate Conception
- December 24 – Christmas Eve
- December 31 – Last Day of the Year

=== Special (Working) day ===
- February 25 – EDSA People Power Revolution Anniversary

== Entertainment and culture ==
=== January ===
- January 29 – Christina Vanhefflin finishes 4th runner-up at Miss Intercontinental 2025 in Egypt.

=== February ===
- February 3 – Asia Rose Simpson of Quezon City is crowned Miss World Philippines 2026 at the pageant's coronation night held at the SM Mall of Asia Arena in Pasay.
- February 14 – A first edition of the novel El filibusterismo by Jose Rizal dating from 1891 is sold at auction at Leon Gallery in Makati for ₱21 million (US$426,395.94), becoming the most expensive book sold in the Philippines.
- February 21 – Beatrice McClelland finishes in the top 13 at Reina Hispanoamericana 2026 in Bolivia.
- February 23 – Makinaugalingon, a defunct Hiligaynon language newspaper that existed in Western Visayas in the early 20th century, is included in the National Register of the UNESCO Philippines Memory of the World.
- February 26 – The Philippines wins the Guinness World Record for the longest line of oyster shells, with 24,222 empty shells displayed in Ipil, Zamboanga Sibugay to commemorate the province's 25th founding anniversary.

=== April ===
- April 25 – Anne De Mesa is crowned Miss Tourism Worldwide 2026 in Singapore.

=== May ===
- May 1 – The Museo del Galeón, the world's first museum dedicated to the Manila-Acapulco Galleon Trade, opens at the SM Mall of Asia in Pasay.
- May 2 – Bea Millan-Windorski of La Union is crowned Miss Universe Philippines 2026 at the pageant's coronation night held at the SM Mall of Asia Arena in Pasay.
- May 10:
  - The Miss Philippines awards national titles to Miss Universe Philippines 2026 finalists at City of Dreams Manila. Trexy Paris Roxas will be the country's representative in Miss Eco Teen; Catherine Wardle, Miss Teen Universe; Apriel Smith, Miss Charm; Ysabella Ysmael, Miss Cosmo; Jenrose Javier, Miss Eco International; Marian Arellano, Miss Tourism World; Allyson Hetland, Miss Supranational; and Nicole Borromeo, Miss Worldwide.
  - The Philippines wins the Guinness World Record title for the largest display of water lanterns after 11,016 of them are floated on a 12 ha (30 acres) man-made lake during an event in Mexico, Pampanga.
- May 30 – Gazini Ganados and Fuschia Anne Ravena, two of the country's five delegates at the inaugural all-star edition of Miss Grand International in Bangkok, Thailand, finish in the top 5 and the top 18, respectively.

=== June ===
- June 5 – The municipality of Sablayan in Occidental Mindoro is declared a biosphere reserve by UNESCO.
- June 27 – Rina Andrea delos Santos of Ballesteros, Cagayan, is crowned Miss Philippines Earth 2026 at the pageant's coronation night held in Malitbog, Bukidnon.
- June 30 – The National Museum of the Philippines opens a regional branch in Baler, Aurora.

=== July ===
- July 11 – Lyndzy Maranan is crowned Miss Global Universe 2026 in Singapore.
- July 18 – Gwendoline Soriano of Baguio and Sasha Lacuna of Tarlac are crowned Binibining Pilipinas International and Binibining Pilipinas Globe, respectively, at the coronation night of Binibining Pilipinas 2026 held at the Araneta Coliseum in Quezon City.
- July 25 – Alexandra Krishna Oriño and Ma. Kathleen Monjardin are crowned Miss Tourism 2026 and Miss Teen Tourism Universe 2026, respectively, at the coronation events both held in Sri Lanka.
- July 31 – Katrina Llegado is crowned Miss Supranational 2026 in Poland.

=== August ===
- August 5 – The Saint Augustine Parish Church in Baliwag, Bulacan is declared an important cultural property by the National Commission for Culture and the Arts.
- August 7 – Angelica Lopez of Palawan is crowned Reina Filipinas Grand International at the coronation night of the pageant's inaugural edition held at the Newport Performing Arts Theater in Pasay.

=== September ===
- September 1:
  - The KJC King Dome in Davao City, built by the religious group Kingdom of Jesus Christ, opens to the public. The multi-purpose indoor arena, having a seating capacity of 75,000, is the world's largest surpassing the 55,000-seat Philippine Arena in Bulacan.
  - President Marcos issues Proclamation No. 1414, declaring 10 individuals (Nicanor Tiongson and Greg Brillantes for Literature, Imelda Cajipe-Endaya and Nunelucio Alvarado for Visual Arts, Gabriel Formoso for Architecture, Rafael Froilan for Dance, Maria Beatriz Tesoro for Design, Bing Lao for Film and Broadcast Arts, Teodoro Hilado for Theater, and Alfredo Buenaventura for Music) as National Artists of the Philippines.
- September 4 (PT) – Lea Salonga is awarded a star in the Live Performance category of the Hollywood Walk of Fame in Los Angeles, California, United States; becoming the first Filipino to be honored with such recognition.
- September 5 – Asia Rose Simpson finishes in the top 12 at Miss World 2026 in Vietnam.
- September 18 – Sophia Bianca Santos is crowned Miss Elite World 2026 in Egypt.
- September 19 – Red Spiegelman finishes in the Top 6 at Miss International Queen 2026 in Thailand.
- September 25 – Rowena Gonnay of Pasil, Kalinga, is awarded the 2026 ByungSoo Kim Award by Slow Food in recognition of her efforts in preserving indigenous rice varieties and food traditions as co-founder of the group Slow Food Community Pasil.
- September 26 – Maria Andrea Endicio is crowned Miss Polo Universe 2026 at its inaugural edition in the United Arab Emirates.

=== October ===
- October 19 – The Maligcong Rice Terraces in Bontoc, Mountain Province is officially recognized as a national cultural treasure by the National Commission for Culture and the Arts.
- October 29 – The Michelin Guide publishes its 2027 restaurant listings in the Philippines and awards 10 restaurants Michelin Stars.

=== November ===
- November 5 – Three artefacts relating to Philippine documentary heritage (the Laguna Copperplate Inscription; the University of Santo Tomas Baybayin Documents; and the Ramon Obusan Folkloric Group Audiovisual Archive), are included in the UNESCO Memory of the World Regional Register.
- November 7 – Sasha Lacuna finishes in the top 11 at The Miss Globe 2026 in Thailand.
- November 14 – Carmelle Collado, representing the country with the song "Sobra-Sobra", wins the inaugural Eurovision Song Contest Asia in Bangkok, Thailand.

=== Scheduled ===
- November 24 – Bea Millan-Windorski will compete at Miss Universe 2026 in Puerto Rico.
- November 25 – Katrina Anne Johnson will compete at Miss International 2026 in Japan.
- December 12 – Rina Andrea delos Santos will compete at Miss Earth 2026 at the Quirino Grandstand in Manila.

== Deaths ==
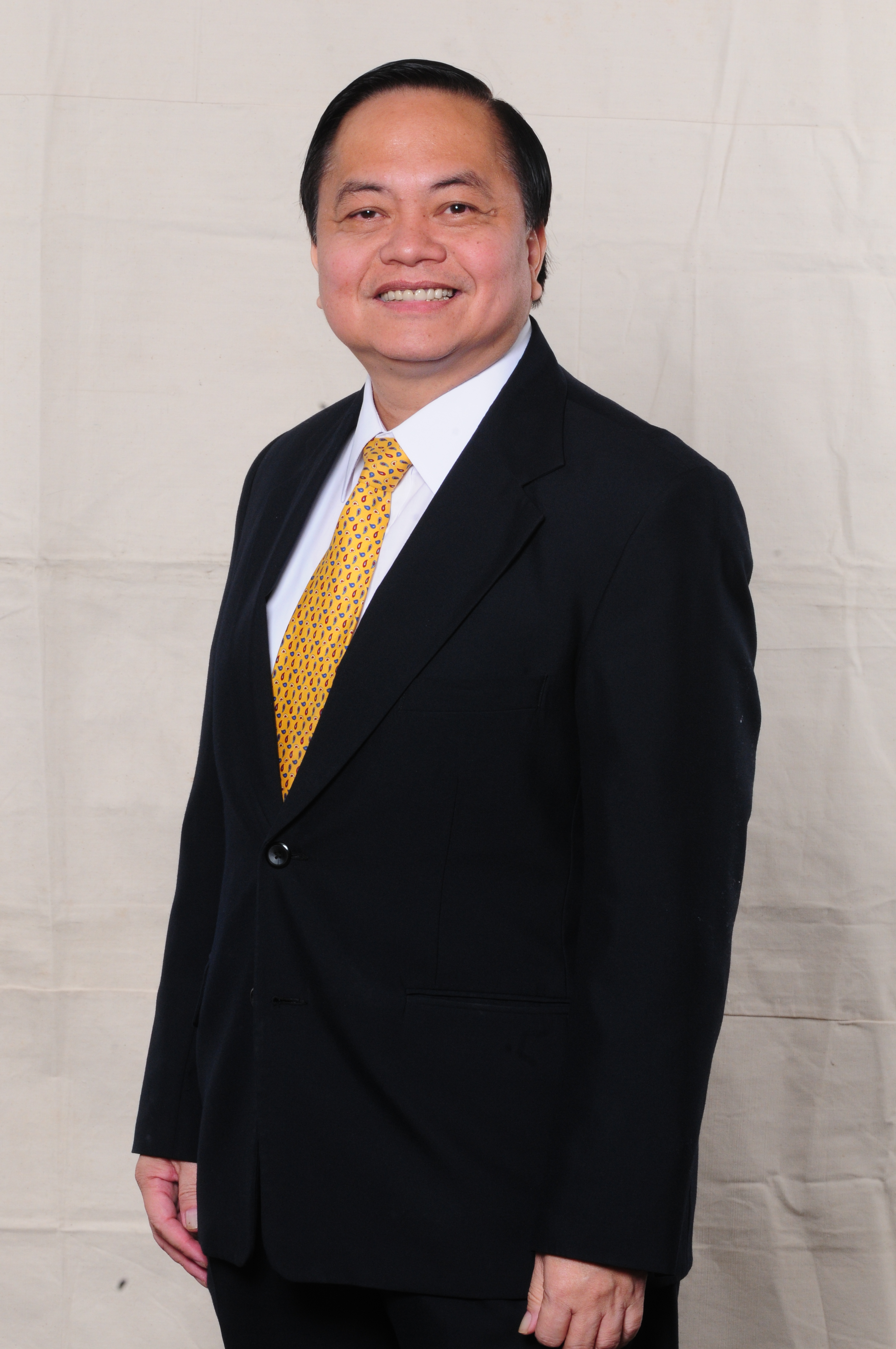
Aniceto Sobrepeña

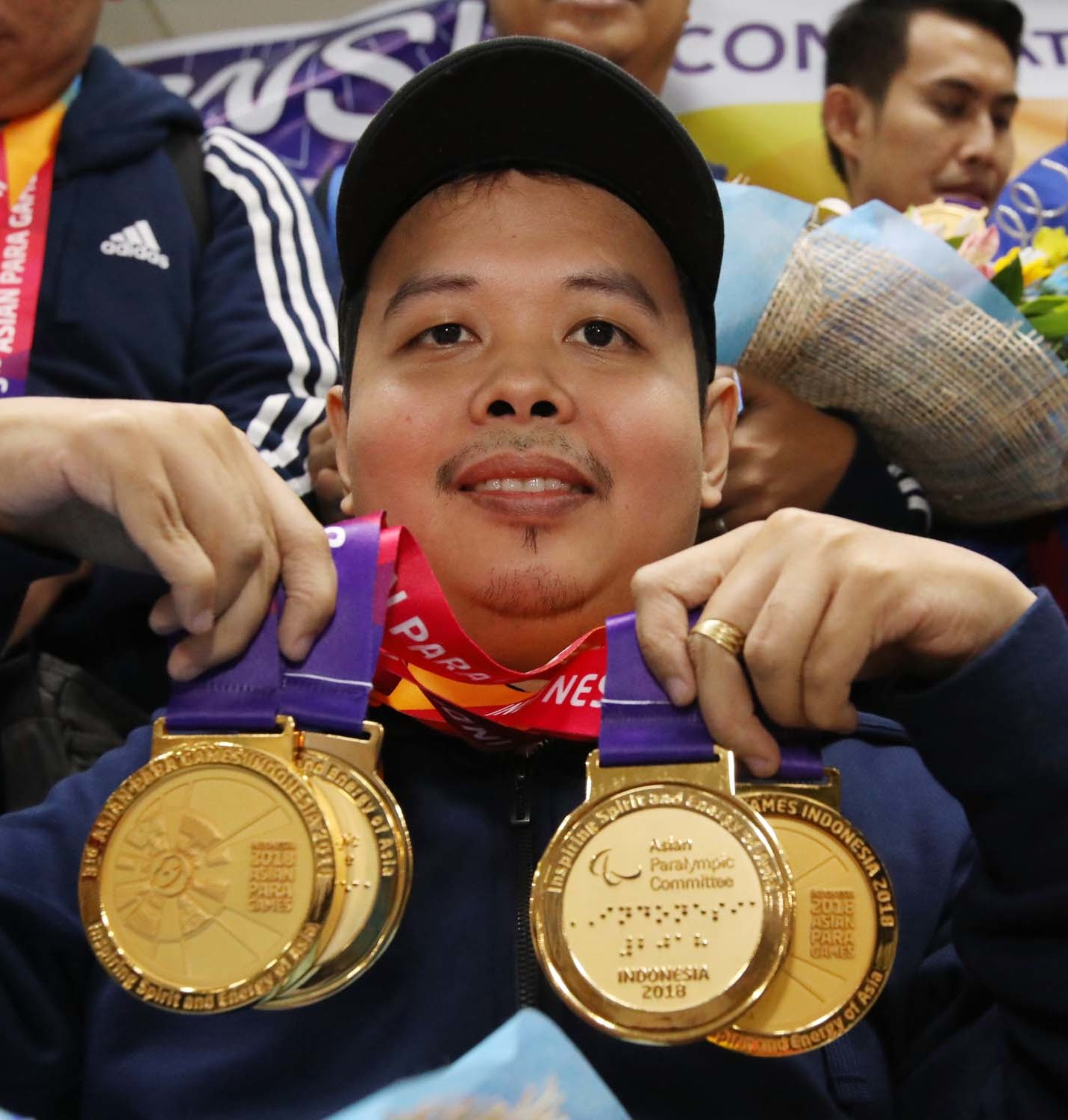
Sander Severino

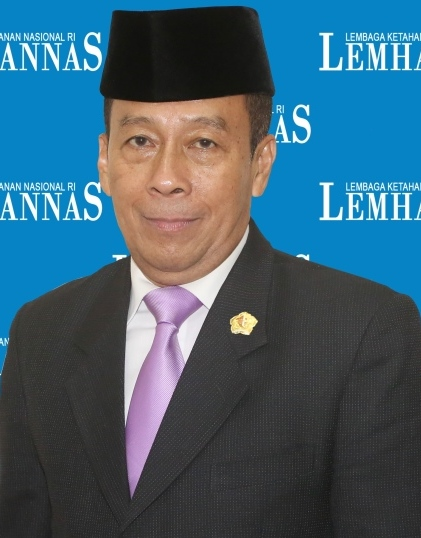
Agus Widjojo

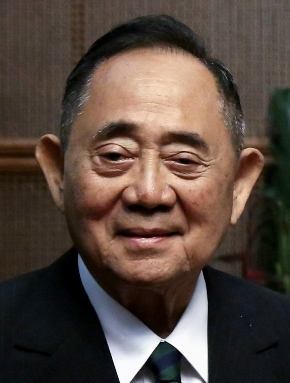
Jose de Venecia Jr.

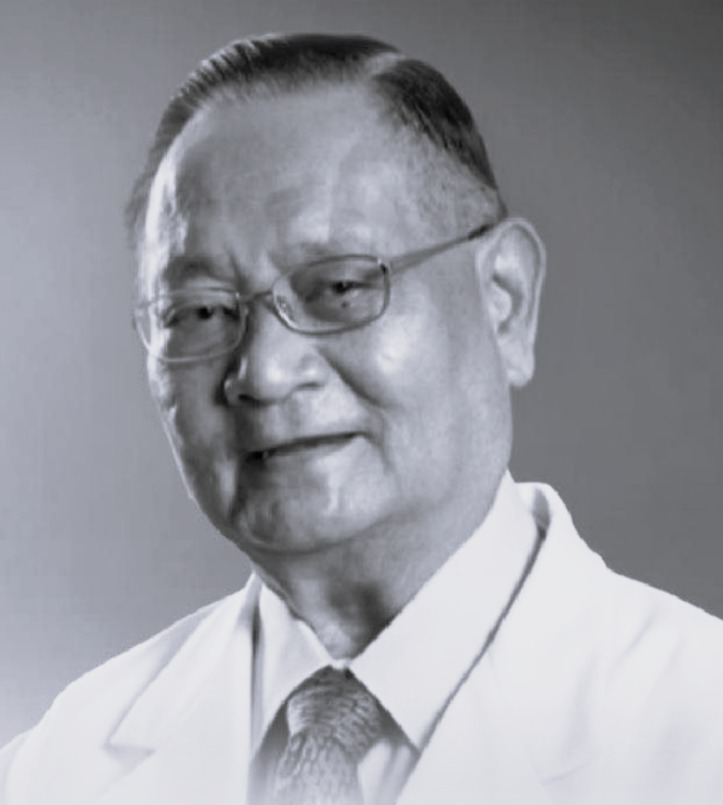
Alfredo Bengzon

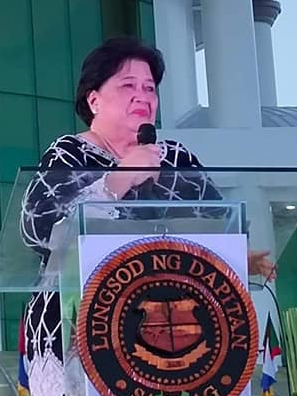
Rosalina Jalosjos

Resil B. Mojares

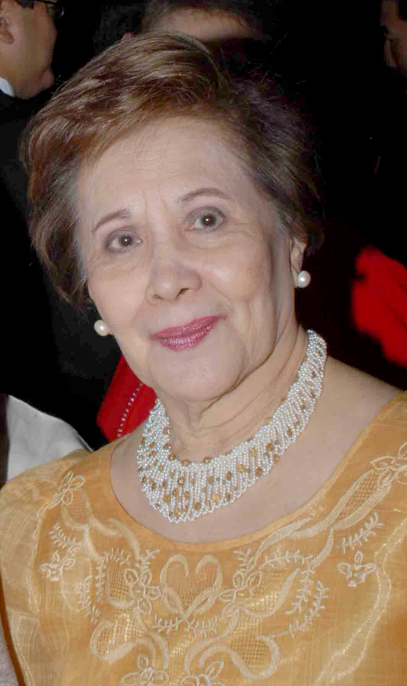
Eugenia Apostol

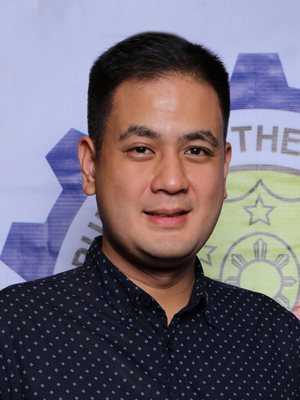
Dakila Cua

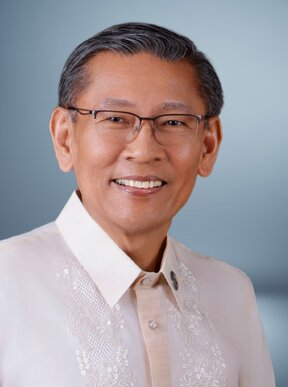
Jun Gato

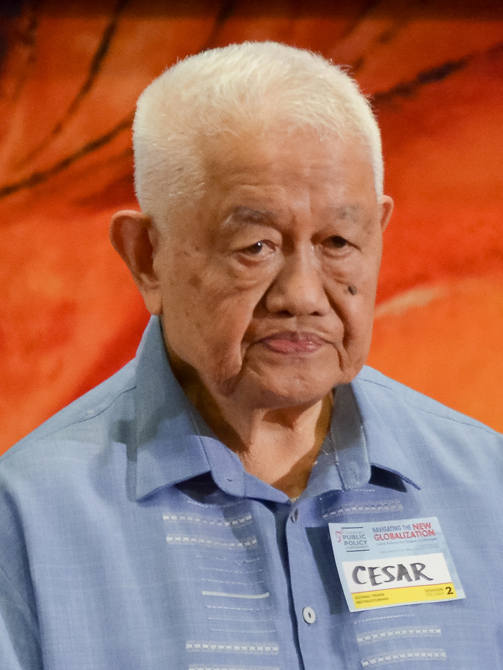
Cesar Virata

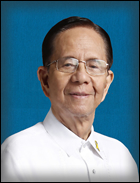
Raul Daza

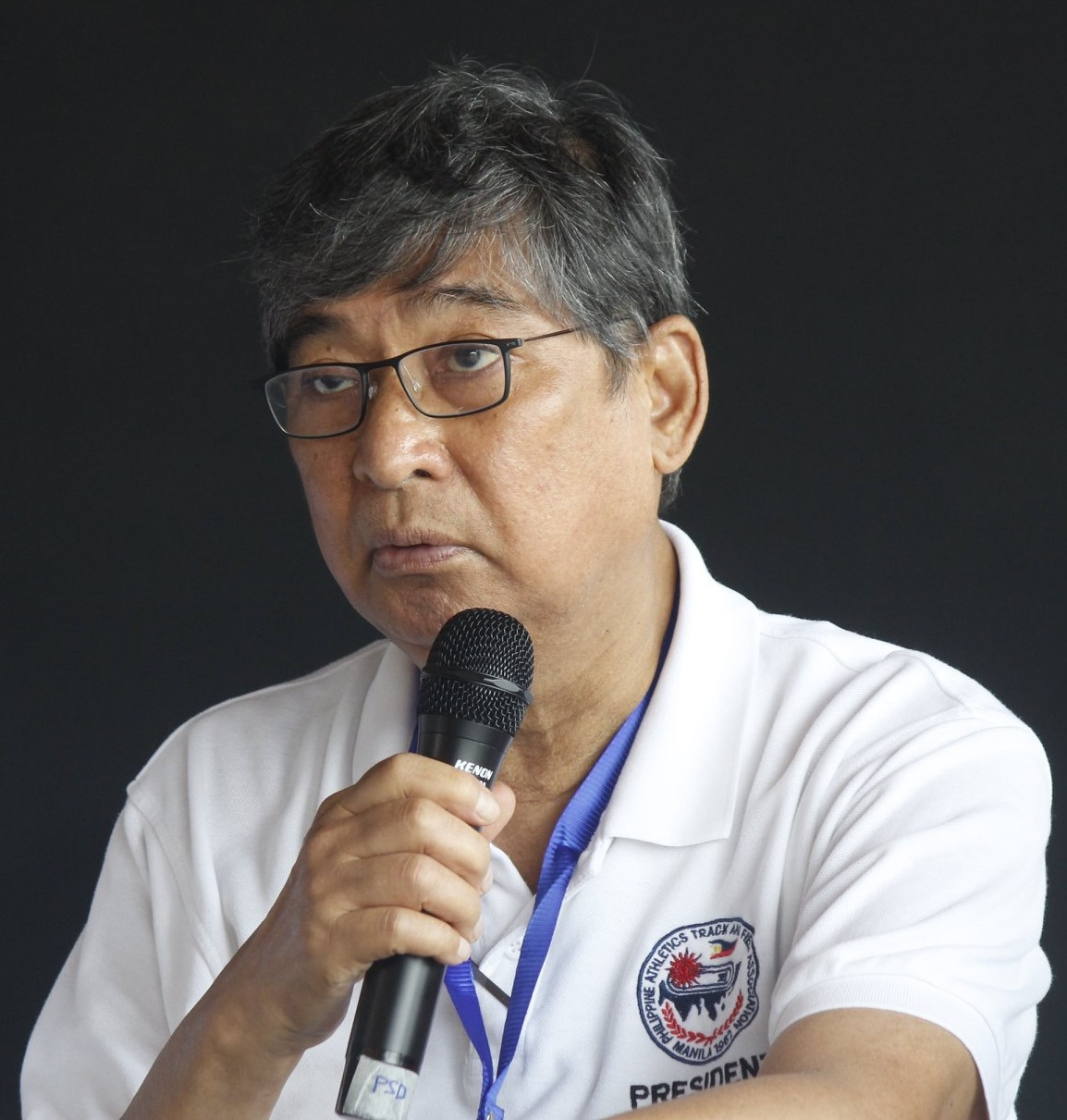
Philip Juico

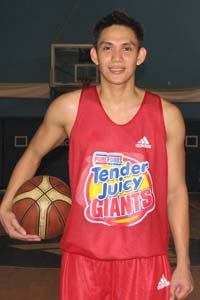
PJ Simon

=== January ===
- January 4 – Marissa Sanchez (b. 1956), tennis player
- January 11 – Aniceto Sobrepeña (b. 1953), banker
- January 13 – Sara Jane Paez (b. 1968), beauty queen (Binibining Pilipinas–Universe 1989)
- January 22 – Raoul Aragon (b. 1947), actor (Ina Ka ng Anak Mo)
- January 28 – Isabelo San Luis (b. 1944), Catholic priest, writer, television producer and host

=== February ===
- February 7 – Sander Severino (b. 1985), chess player
- February 8 – Agus Widjojo (b. 1947), diplomat and Indonesian ambassador to the Philippines (since 2022)
- February 10 – Jose de Venecia Jr. (b. 1936), Speaker of the House of Representatives (1992–1998, 2001–2008), representative of the 2nd (1969–1972) and 4th districts of Pangasinan (1987–1998, 2001–2010), 1998 presidential candidate for Lakas, and columnist
- February 12 – Vangie Labalan (b. 1943), actress (Manila by Night, Himala, Bobo Cop) and comedian
- February 21 – Vicente L. Rafael (b. 1956), historian
- February 26 – Pepito Rodriguez (b. 1942), actor (Sa Bilis Walang Kaparis)

=== March ===
- March 3 – Alfredo Bengzon (b. 1935), physician and Secretary of Health (1986–1992)

=== April ===
- April 2 – Misua (b. 1998), drag performer
- April 12 – Edgardo Roque (b. 1938), Olympic basketball player (1960)
- April 14:
  - Sue Prado (b. 1981), actress (Oro, Barber's Tales, Manila Skies)
  - Eva Maamo (b. 1940), religious sister and Ramon Magsaysay Awardee.
- April 28 – Perry Mariano (b. 1951), billiards player

=== May ===
- May 5 – Dante Ang (b. 1942), journalist and newspaper owner (The Manila Times)
- May 13 – Ed Finlan (b. 1948), actor (Annie Batungbakal) and television director (People's Television Network)

=== June ===
- June 8:
  - Divine Adili (b. 2005), Nigerian-born basketball player (Ateneo Blue Eagles)
  - Rene Baterbonia (b. 2008), basketball player (Ateneo Blue Eagles)
- June 16 – Romy Guevarra (b. 1936 or 1937), basketball referee
- June 24 – Emilio Bataclan (b. 1940), Roman Catholic prelate, auxiliary bishop of Cebu (1990–1995, 2004–2015) and bishop of Iligan (1995–2004)
- June 28 – Haron Abas, member of the Bangsamoro Parliament

=== July ===
- July 8 – Reli German (b. 1939), activist and public relations specialist
- July 12 – Kent Carpenter (b. 1953), American marine biologist (Silliman University)
- July 17 – Mima Alicia (b. 2001/02), political vlogger
- July 20 – Amor Deloso (b. 1938), governor of Zambales (1986–1998, 2007–2010, 2016–2019)
- July 23 – Jose Sison (b. 1938), lawyer and television host

=== August ===
- August 2 – Romeo Jalosjos Sr. (b. 1940), businessman, convicted child rapist, and representative of the 1st district of Zamboanga del Norte (1995–2002)
- August 14 – Rosalina Jalosjos (b. 1947), mayor of Dapitan (2013–2022) and governor of Zamboanga del Norte (2022–2025)

=== September ===
- September 5 – Resil B. Mojares (b. 1943), author, historian, and National Artist for Literature.
- September 14 – Eugenia Apostol (b. 1925), journalist and publisher, founder of the Philippine Daily Inquirer.
- September 15 – Dakila Cua (b. 1977), governor (2007–2010, since 2019), vice governor (2001–2007) and representative of Quirino (2010–2019).
- September 21 – Ciriaco Gato Jr. (b. 1959), representative of Batanes (since 2019).
- September 25 – Leo Gaje (b. 1938), martial artist

=== October ===
- October 2 – Cesar Virata (b. 1930), prime minister (1981–1986), secretary of finance (1970–1986), and MP (1978–1986)
- October 11 – Erlinda Villalobos (b. 1942), actress (Ekstra and Manang Biring)
- October 12 – Raul Daza (b. 1935), representative (1969–1972, 1987–1998, 2010–2013, 2016–2019) and governor of Northern Samar (2001–2010)
- October 17 – Randy See (b. 1991), model, actor and television host
- October 31 – Philip Juico (b. 1947), sports executive and politician, president of the Philippine Athletics Track and Field Association (2015–2022), chairman of the Philippine Sports Commission (1996–1998) and Secretary of Agrarian Reform (1987–1989)

=== November ===
- November 1 – Ate Gay (b. 1971), comedian and television presenter (Comedy Bar, Wowowillie)
- November 17 – Jorrybell Agoto (b. 1994), actress (When This Is All Over, Filipiñana)
- November 20 – PJ Simon (b. 1980), basketball player (Magnolia Hotshots, Davao Occidental Tigers)

== See also ==
=== Country overviews ===
- History of the Philippines
- History of the Philippines (1986–present)
- Outline of the Philippines
- Government of the Philippines
- Politics of the Philippines
- List of years in the Philippines
- Timeline of Philippine history

=== Related timelines for current period ===
- 2026
- 2026 in politics and government
- 2020s
