= Landfill fire =

Waste ignition

A landfill fire occurs when waste disposed of in a landfill ignites and spreads. Two types of landfills fires are generally recognized – surface fires and deep-seated fires. Surface fires typically occur in underdeveloped countries that lack capacity to properly cover waste with inert daily and intermediate cover. Modern examples of such fires include the Deonar and Ghazipur Landfills in India, Cerro Patacon Landfill in Panama and the New Providence Landfill in the Bahamas.

In landfills that do not cover their waste with daily cover, air intrusion provides the oxygen required for increased biological activity decomposition that creates substantial heat and can cause material in the landfills to spontaneously combust.. If unchecked, spontaneous combustion fires in particular tend to burn deeper into the waste mass, resulting in deep seated fires. In the U.S. 40% of landfill fires are attributed to arson.

Landfill fires are especially dangerous as they can emit dangerous fumes from the combustion of the wide range of materials contained within the landfill. Key parameters of concern are carbon monoxide, hydrogen sulphide, volatile organics. Production of dioxins and furans is also a documented risk factor.

Subsurface landfill fires also, unlike a typical fire, are difficult to put out with water unless an overhaul operation is undertaken. They are similar to coal seam fires and peat fires. Oxygen intrusion control is the best method to prevent and fight subsurface landfill fires as long as the fire fighting team can be confident that all air entry pathways are effectively blocked. "Fuel quenching", by allowing landfill gas build-up, can work well, especially in conjunction with maintenance of the daily cover of soil or material places on landfills. However, this oxygen suppression method can be compromised if cracks develop in the soil cover due to settlement.

Nearby streams can be threatened by leachate pools which may form if water is used to extinguish fires in landfills. for this reason, recirculation of fire fighting water should be considered to minimize environmental impacts. There is also the danger that the landfill's membrane, a barrier placed under most modern landfills to prevent contamination of the underlying ground, will be destroyed or penetrated by the fire itself. Normally this liner prevents harmful liquids contained within the landfill from escaping into the groundwater and nearby streams. Destruction of the liner therefore leads to serious environmental problems.

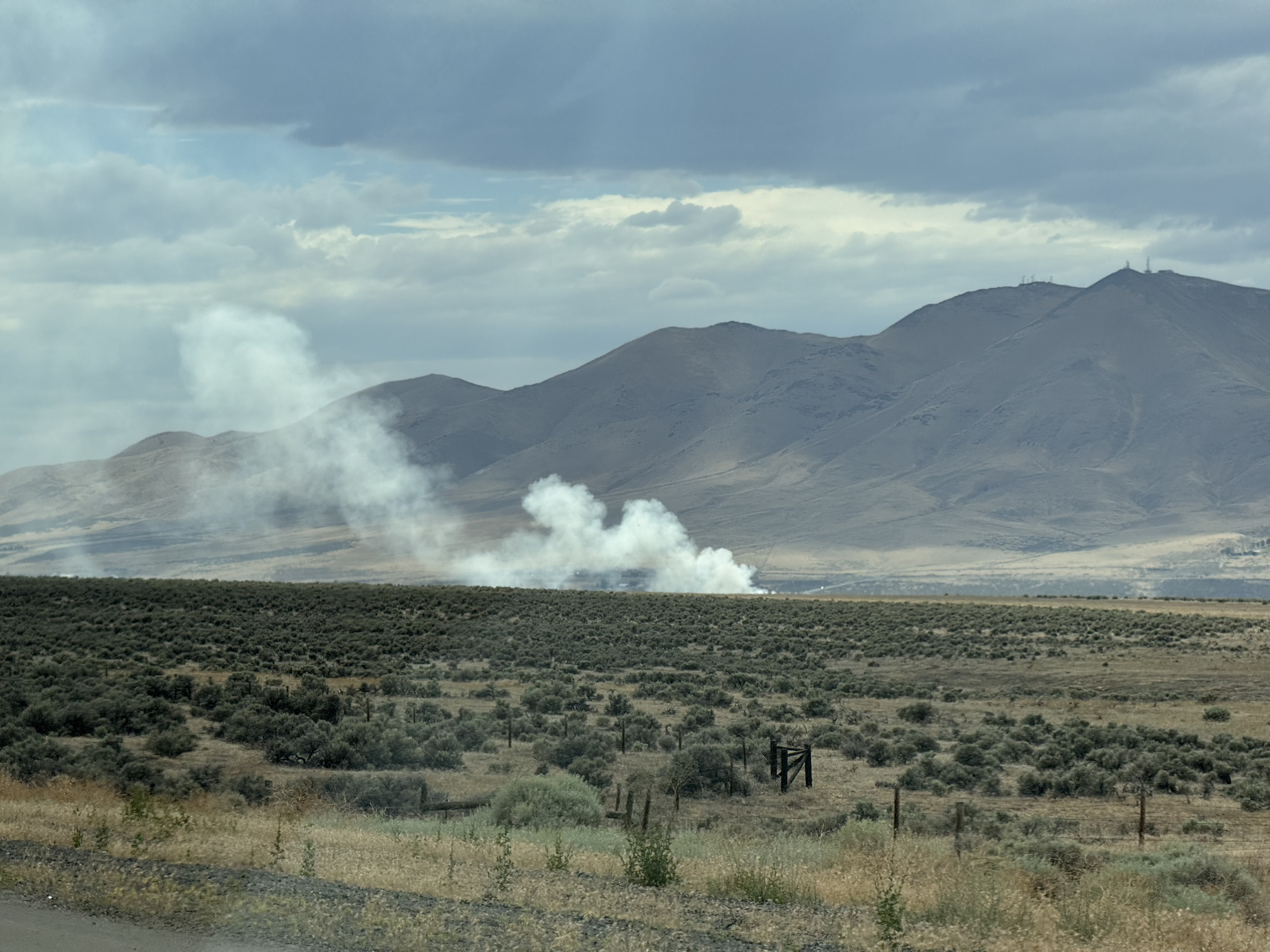
A recycling plant fire in Winnemucca, Nevada on July 13, 2026

Recycling facility fires are often caused by improperly disposed lithium–ion batteries. In Scandinavia, recycling plant fires are more common in spring when facilities receive yard waste, numbers peak in North America in summer. Recycling plant fire have been increasing in occurrence in North America in recent years, reaching 390 reports in the United States and Canada in 2022. In 2022, they killed three people and injured 63. The uptick is attributed to an increasing number of recycling facilities due to more demand, new hazards in recycled materials, shifts in waste management tactics. Flammable substances are often recycled by citizens or are mixed with debris. This issue is complicated by the rising number of recycled items with lithium–ion batteries that self–ignite when crushed.

== Notable landfill fires ==
- On January 26, 1998, in Maalaea, Hawaii, a fire 15–20 ft (4.6–6.1 m) underground. The fire was eventually deemed to be extinguished in a matter of weeks, with injections of more than 1,000 pounds (450 kg) of liquid carbon dioxide. It continued to smolder for four months.
- An underground landfill fire that was discovered in December 1996 in Danbury, Connecticut caused a strong odor like rotten eggs due to the high concentration of hydrogen sulfide. The fire lasted for weeks and the town was forced to install a gas recovery system, the cost of which exceeded $1 million.
- In early November 1999, at the Delta Shake and Shingle Landfill in North Delta, British Columbia. The fire burned 20–30 m (66–98 ft) deep. On November 27, Delta's Mayor declared a state of local emergency. Extinguishing the fire took slightly more than two months and cost more than $4 million (Canadian).
- On September 2, 2007 a large fire at the regional landfill in Fredericton, New Brunswick forced residents to stay indoors because of fears the smoke could be toxic.
- On December 23, 2010, Republic Services reported elevated gas extraction well temperatures, indicative of a smoldering landfill fire, at West Lake Landfill. The smoldering fire continues to burn today, which has involved the Environmental Protection Agency, Missouri's Attorney General Chris Koster, Missouri Department of Natural Resources, Missouri Department of Health and Senior Services, and St. Louis County Department of Health. The smoldering fire was estimated to be roughly 1,000 feet (300 m) away from radioactive wastes illegally dumped at the landfill in 1973.
- On April 10, 2026, a fire broke out at the Navotas Sanitary Landfill in Navotas, Metro Manila, Philippines burning around 70 percent of the landfill and causing smog in parts of Metro Manila. The fire has persisted for at least three weeks.

== See also ==
- Dumpster fire
