= Mohamed Ameen (disambiguation) =

Mohamed Ameen (1910–1954) was the president and prime minister of the Maldives in 1953.

Mohamed Ameen may also refer to:

== People ==
- Mohamed Ameen (minister), Maldivian politician and Minister of Transport and Civil Aviation
- Mohammed Ameen, Saudi Arabian former footballer
- Muhammad Ameen, nom de guerre of Filipino rebel Haron Abas

== Places ==
- Aminiya School, also known as Mohamed Ameen school, a school named after Mohamed Ameen
