= Lo Colby =

American beauty pageant titleholder

- Born: Oʻahu, Hawaii, USA
- Title: Miss International Queen USA 2026; Miss International Queen 2026
- Predecessor: Midori Monét

Lo Colby is a Thai-American beauty pageant titleholder, technology professional, entrepreneur, content creator, and drag artist who represented the United States at Miss International Queen 2026, where she was crowned the winner on September 19, 2026, at Tiffany's Show Theatre in Pattaya, Thailand. Her victory marked the United States' second consecutive win in the competition. Colby also received the Best in Talent award during the 2026 competition.

== Early life and background ==
Colby is a first-generation Thai-American originally from Hawaii and was raised on the island of Oahu. She later moved to Los Angeles, California, where she is based in West Hollywood.

According to interviews with Colby, she became involved in the drag scene before beginning her transition. She later began competing in drag pageants and became interested in transgender pageantry.

== Career ==
Colby works in the technology industry and has also worked as an entrepreneur, content creator, and drag artist. The Miss International Queen USA organization describes her career as being at the intersection of technology, artistry and advocacy.

She has collaborated with organizations including GLAAD, amfAR, Camp Lightbulb, and the Los Angeles LGBT Center on fundraising and community initiatives. Her advocacy has included economic empowerment for transgender people through financial education, career access and entrepreneurship.

== Pageantry ==
=== Miss International Queen USA 2026 ===
Colby competed in the 2026 edition of Miss International Queen USA, held at Harrah's Resort in Atlantic City, New Jersey. She was crowned Miss International Queen USA 2026, succeeding Midori Monét, who had won the international Miss International Queen title in 2025.

=== Miss International Queen 2026 ===
Colby represented the United States at Miss International Queen 2026, the 20th edition of the international transgender beauty pageant held in Pattaya, Thailand. The competition featured delegates from 27 countries and was held under the theme "The Evolving Legacy: Empower Every Voice".

During the National Costume and Talent Quest, Colby won the Best in Talent award. Saki Iwai of Japan was the first runner-up in the talent competition, while Nguyen Cao Minh Anh of Vietnam was the second runner-up.

The crowning finale was held at the Tiffany's Show Pattaya Theatre on 19 September 2026.

== Advocacy ==
Colby's pageant platform focuses on economic empowerment for transgender people, particularly through education, career opportunities and entrepreneurship. She has also spoken about diversity, equity and inclusion in the workplace and the importance of creating sustainable career opportunities for transgender and queer people.

== Personal life ==
Colby has described herself as being from a supportive family in Hawaii. She has discussed her gender identity and transition in interviews, including her experiences becoming involved in the drag community and later beginning her transition.

Awards and achievements
Preceded by (United States) Midori Monét	Miss International Queen; 2026	Succeeded by Incumbent
Preceded by Midori Monét	Miss International Queen USA; 2026	Succeeded by Incumbent
