= Navotas landfill fire =

2026 fire in Navotas, Philippines

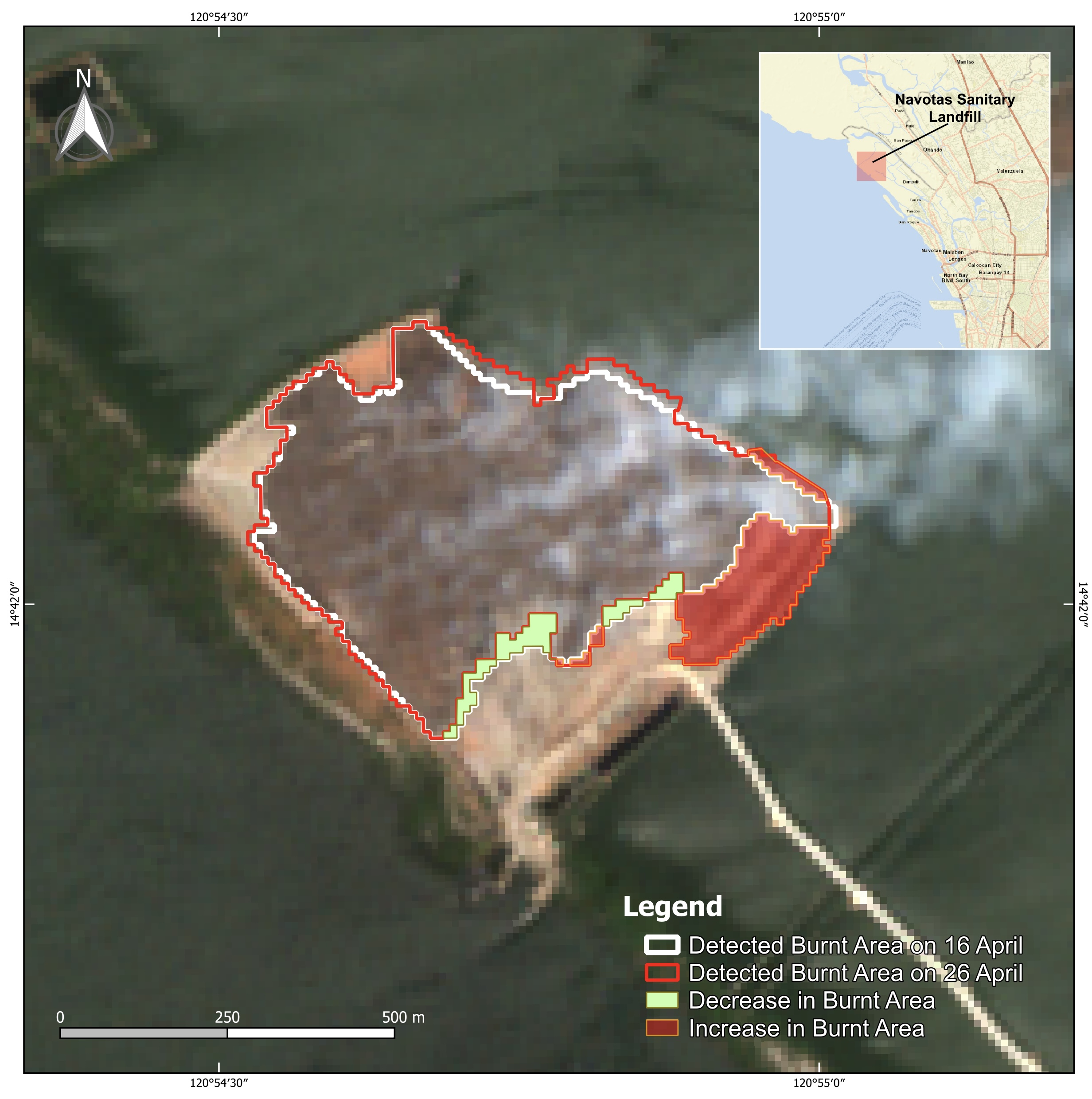
- Estimated burnt area extent of the landfill fire in Navotas, as assessed by the Philippine Space Agency on 26 April 2026, using satellite imagery captured by the Sentinel-2 satellite.
- Date: April 10 – May 10, 2026 (30 days)
- Location: Navotas Sanitary Landfill; 14°42′03″N 120°54′44″E
- Type: Landfill fire
- Cause: Methane buildup and high temperature
- Deaths: 1
- Property damage: At least 71 percent of the landfill burned
- Displaced: ~500 evacuees

On April 10, 2026, a fire broke out at the closed Navotas Sanitary Landfill in Navotas, Metro Manila, Philippines. The fire generated large amounts of smoke that resulted in hazardous air quality and evacuations in Metro Manila and Bulacan. The fire was extinguished a month later, on May 10, after having burned through roughly 70% of the landfill.

== Background ==
The Navotas Sanitary Landfill is a 41.121 ha (101.61 acres) landfill on an island. The facility, which opened in 2006, was operated by the Philippine Ecology Systems Corporation (Phileco).

A court-approved expropriation in 2023 turned over the property to the San Miguel Aerocity Inc. (SMAI) for the proposed New Manila International Airport. Phileco closed the landfill on August 26, 2025 ahead of its franchise expiration in December. Phileco vacated the facility in February 2026.

== Fire ==
A fire broke out at the closed Navotas Sanitary Landfill on April 10, 2026 at around 19:56 PHT (UTC+8). According to the Bureau of Fire Protection (BFP), methane gas buildup and extreme heat were the cause of the fire.

To suppress the fire, firetrucks, two barges with water tankers, and helicopters of the Philippine Air Force were used. The BFP declared the fire was under control on April 12.

Soil capping was later used to further suppress the fire. Tidal conditions has hindered watercraft from reaching the site. An access road was built to connect the island to the mainland.

Upon the request of the Philippine government, the Japan International Cooperation Agency dispatched a Japan Disaster Relief (JDR) team which arrived in Manila on April 23. They assessed and approved the methods implemented before their arrival.

Half of the fire was extinguished by April 28, according to Public Works secretary Vince Dizon. By May 6, 80% of the fire had been contained according to the Metropolitan Manila Development Authority (MMDA). The fire was declared extinguished by president Bongbong Marcos on May 10.

== Impact ==
The Philippine Space Agency, analyzing satellite imagery, notes that 28.6 ha (71 acres) or 71.5 percent of the landfill was burned as of April 16, 2026.

Smog from the fire affected various parts of Metro Manila. Around 500 people living on nearby islands were evacuated away from the landfill. One evacuee, a 54-year-old woman with a history of heart and kidney disease died.

== Reactions ==
=== Potential lawsuit ===
The Department of Environment and Natural Resources (DENR)’s Environmental Management Bureau in the National Capital Region (EMB-NCR) has considered filing criminal, administrative, and civil charges over Phileco over the landfill fire.

DENR EMB-NCR alleged that Phileco failed to complete its Safe Closure and Rehabilitation Plan (SCRP) when it vacated the facility in February 2026 or two months after its franchise expired.

=== Religious sector ===
The Kalookan bishop Cardinal Pablo Virgilio David issued an Oratio Imperata or special prayer to be recited in masses under the jurisdiction of the diocese on May 1, 2026 in response to the fire.
