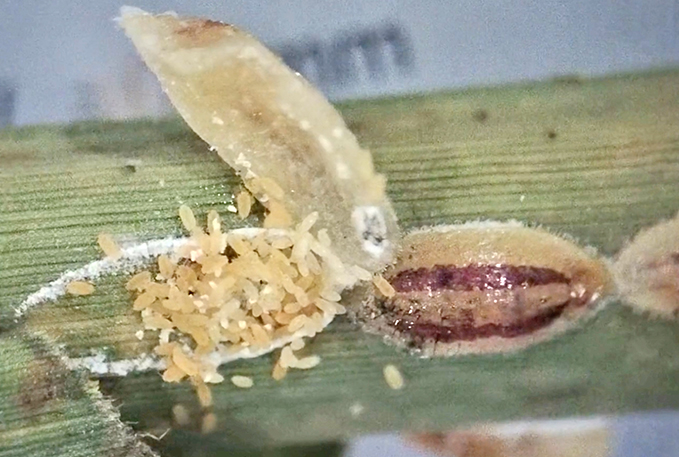

Scientific classification
- Kingdom: Animalia
- Phylum: Arthropoda
- Clade: Pancrustacea
- Class: Insecta
- Order: Hemiptera
- Suborder: Sternorrhyncha
- Family: Coccidae
- Genus: Pulvinaria
- Species: P. tenuivalvata

Binomial name
- Pulvinaria tenuivalvata Newstead, 1911

Synonyms
- Pulvinaria saccharia

= Pulvinaria tenuivalvata =

Species of true bug

Pulvinaria tenuivalvata is a parthenogenetic species of scale insect in the family Coccidae and a major pest of sugarcane. It is commonly known as the red-striped soft scale insect, sometimes abbreviated RSSI. It occurs throughout large parts of Africa, and, since 2022, also in the Philippines.

== Taxonomy ==
The species was first described by Robert Newstead in 1911 as Lecanium tenuivalvatum, infecting Cymbopogon citratus in Uganda, and was moved to the genus Pulvinaria by Giovanni De Lotto in 1965. De Lotto also described Pulvinaria saccharia as a pest of sugar cane, which emerged upon closer inspection to be a synonym of Pulvinaria tenuivalvata.

== Biology ==
Pulvinaria tenuivalvata reproduces by thelytokous parthenogenesis, where diploid females reproduce without mating and all resulting offspring is female; under laboratory conditions, an average of around 200 eggs have been observed to be produced by a single female. Individuals follow a life cycle of three nymphal instars before reaching adulthood, only the first of which (known as a crawler) moves readily. Second and third instar nymphs remain at their chosen feeding site, but are able to move in response to disturbance. Adults have been seen to live for more than two months on healthy host plants. They are photonegative, preferring the lower sides of host plants as feeding sites.

== Morphology ==
The adult female of Pulvinaria tenuivalvata is very elongate, convex with the cephalic region flattened. It is 3.4-6.5 mm long and 1.5-2.5 mm wide. The body colour varies from pale crimson to flesh-coloured with two irregular longitudinal bands of bright crimson on the dorsum. Its dorsal setae are stout, conical, 10–15 μm long, not lanceolate and scattered all over the body surface. Their ventral surface features tubular ducts, which are numerous around the entire body, except in the caudal area and the head region, where they are sparse.

Nymphs are smaller and without abundant tubular ducts. Crawlers have a length of 445-890μm and a width of 185-200μm, second instar females a length of 1.1-1.7mm and a width of 385-600μm, and third instar females a length of 1.75-1.95mm and a width of 640-650μm.

== Ecology ==
The species was first described in 1911 infesting Cymbopogon citratus in Uganda. By 1964, it has been found infesting sugar cane in South Africa, and has emerged as a major pest of sugar cane in Egypt. First recorded there in 1992, it was the main pest of the crop in Egypt by 2001. It attacks leaves, causing a major reduction in crop yield due to depletion of sap, production of honeydew and growth of sooty mould. Early and heavy infestations have resulted in complete yield loss.. It is associated with the grass family Poaceae, although it has been found on hosts from other plant families, namely Convolvulus arvensis (Convolvulaceae) and Sida acuta (Malvaceae). In addition to sugar cane, prominent host plants include rice, maize, sorghum, lemon grass, Cogon grass, elephant grass and Deccan grass, although sugar cane has been shown in studies to be a preferred host..

The distribution of Pulvinaria tenuivalvata covers wide parts of Africa, having been recorded in Ethiopia, Kenya, Mali, Senegal, Sierra Leone, Tanzania, Zimbabwe in addition to Uganda, South Africa and Egypt as mentioned above. Since 2022, it has emerged as a major pest of sugar cane in the Philippines, with first detection confirmed on Luzon in June 2022 and on Negros in 2025. It was confirmed to have spread to Northern Mindanao in June 2026.

Pulvinaria tenuivalvata is itself host to parasitoid Coccophagus species, which have been observed to kill a majority of scale insects within a population.
