= List of people pardoned or granted clemency by the president of the Philippines =

This is a partial list of people pardoned or granted clemency by the President of the Philippines.

The current 1987 Constitution gives the President the ability to grant "executive clemency at anytime and under any circumstance". The Department of Justice annually gives lists of those recommended for pardons, which include inmates who are elderly and persons with disabilities. It is custom for pardons to be issued at Christmas and the birthday of a sitting President.

== Jose P. Laurel ==
Individuals pardoned by Jose P. Laurel.

- Feliciano Lizardo – assassin who attempted to take the life of Laurel at the Wack Wack golf course in 1943.

== Manuel Roxas ==
Individuals pardoned by Manuel Roxas. Among them are beneficiaries of Proclamation No. 51 which is a general amnesty for people charged for collaborating with Imperial Japan during the Japanese occupation of the Philippines in World War II.

- Jose P. Laurel – President of the Second Philippine Republic, the puppet state of the Empire of Japan during World War II.

== Elpidio Quirino ==
Quirino granted executive clemency to 114 Japanese prisoners involved in World War II in July 1953.

== Ferdinand Marcos ==
Individuals pardoned by Ferdinand Marcos.

- Butch Belgica – convicted for murder at 16 years old and pardoned in 1976
- Hiroo Onoda – Imperial Japanese soldier who remained in hiding in the Philippines even after the official end of World War II. Pardoned for his actions against the residents of Lubang Island, including allegedly killing up to 30 civilians.
- Hadji Kamlon – Tausug who led the Kamlon rebellion against the government from 1948 to 1955.
- Luis Taruc – Leader of the Hukbalahap, a communist guerrilla movement. Pleaded guilty to rebellion in August 1954 and was sentenced to 12 years imprisonment; convicted for the murder of Tarlac Governor Feliciano Gardiner, and was sentenced to four life sentences. Pardoned on September 11, 1968.

== Fidel V. Ramos ==
Individuals pardoned by Fidel V. Ramos.

- Robin Padilla – Film actor convicted for illegal possession of firearms in 1994. Granted a conditional pardon from April 1997 to 2003.
- Jaime Tadeo – Kilusang Magbubukid ng Pilipinas leader charged of swindling during the Martial law era under President Ferdinand Marcos. Granted absolute pardon by Ramos in 1998.

== Gloria Macapagal Arroyo ==
Individuals pardoned by Gloria Macapagal Arroyo.

- Joseph Estrada – Arroyo's predecessor deposed in the Second EDSA Revolution in 2001. Convicted of plunder on September 12, 2007. Granted pardon on October 26, 2007, just six weeks after his conviction.

== Benigno Aquino III ==
Individuals pardoned by Benigno Aquino III.

- Antonio Trillanes, Danilo Lim and Renato Miranda – lead figures of the Oakwood mutiny against the administration of President Gloria Macapagal Arroyo in 2003.

== Rodrigo Duterte ==
Individuals pardoned by Rodrigo Duterte.

- Robin Padilla – actor convicted for illegal possession of firearms in 1994. Previously granted a conditional pardon by President Fidel V. Ramos effective from 1997 to 2003. Granted absolute pardon in 2016.
- Jovito Plameras Jr. – first elected Governor of Antique. Convicted for graft. Granted conditional pardon in 2016 if he pays the Antique provincial government ₱2.65 million.
- Joseph Scott Pemberton – American military personnel convicted for the homicide of transgender woman Jennifer Laude in 2014. Granted absolute pardon in 2020.

== Bongbong Marcos ==
Individuals pardoned or granted clemency by President Bongbong Marcos.

- Jed Patrick Mabilog – Mayor of Iloilo City from 2010 until his dismissal by the Ombudsman in 2017, after he was found guilty of Serious Dishonesty (administrative case) for failing to explain his ₱8.9 million gain in wealth while in office. Granted executive clemency on January 15, 2025.
- Mary Jane Veloso – Convicted of drug trafficking in 2010. Granted absolute pardon on September 24, 2026.
