= Miss International Queen 2026 =

20th Miss International Queen beauty pageant

- Date: 19 September 2026
- Presenters: Luke Ishikawa Plowden; Saraichatt Jirapatt
- Theme: The Evolving Legacy
- Venue: Tiffany's Show Pattaya, Pattaya, Thailand
- Entrants: 27
- Placements: 12
- Debuts: New Zealand
- Withdrawals: Chile; China; Czech Republic
- Returns: Canada; Costa Rica; France; Honduras; Singapore; Spain
- Winner: Lo Colby; United States
- Congeniality: Sofía Valencia (Honduras)
- Best National Costume: Saki Iwai (Japan)

Miss International Queen 2026 was the 20th Miss International Queen pageant, Held at the Tiffany's Show Pattaya in Pattaya, Thailand on September 19, 2026.

Midori Monét of the United States crowned Lo Colby of the United States at the end of the event. This achievement marks the fourth victory for the United States, as well as the first back-to-back victory in the pageant's history.

== Results ==
=== Placements ===
Placement	Contestant
Miss International Queen 2026	United States – Lo Colby ☆
1st Runner-Up	Thailand – Theerachaya Pimkitidaj ★
2nd Runner-Up	Japan – Saki Iwai
Top 6	Colombia – Catalina Vallejo; France – Inès Mess; Philippines – Red Spiegelman
Top 12	Brazil – Angel Gadelha; Costa Rica – Alejandra Vargus; Laos – Lisa Saengdala; Malaysia – Shazzyra Zahry; Venezuela – Danielal Marquina; Vietnam – Minh Anh Nguyễn

Notes:

- ★ – Straight into the top 12 by winning the Preliminary Best Performance Award.
- ☆ – Straight into the top 12 by winning the Best Social Influencer Award.

=== Special Awards ===
Award	Contestant
Best in Talent	United States – Lo Colby
Best National Costume	Japan – Saki Iwai
Miss Congeniality	Honduras – Sofía Valencia
Miss Elegant Face	France – Inès Mess
Miss Perfect Skin	Laos – Lisa Saengdala
Miss Sexy Body	Vietnam – Minh Anh Nguyễn
Preliminary Best Performance	Thailand – Theerachaya Pimkitidaj
Wansiri Inspiring Beauty	Thailand – Theerachaya Pimkitidaj

==== Best in Talent ====
Award	Contestant
Winner	United States – Lo Colby
1st Runner-Up	Japan – Saki Iwai
2nd Runner-Up	Vietnam – Minh Anh Nguyễn

==== Preliminary Best Performance ====
Award	Contestant
Winner	Thailand – Theerachaya Pimkitidaj
Top 4	France – Inès Mess; Japan – Saki Iwai; Philippines – Red Spiegelman

==== Best National Costume ====
Award	Contestant
Winner	Japan – Saki Iwai
Top 4	Mexico – Khloe Ríos-Wyatt; Thailand – Theerachaya Pimkitidaj; Venezuela – Danielal Marquina

== Contestants ==
The confirmed contestants are as follows:

Country/Territory	Contestant	Age (Note: Ages at the time of the pageant)	Hometown
Brazil	Angel Gadelha	24	Maceió
Canada	Averii	23	Ottawa
Colombia	Catalina Vallejo	25	Medellín
Costa Rica	Alejandra Vargas	21	San José
Cuba	Naomi Alon	26	Havana
Ecuador	Anahí Festerling	23	Guayaquil
France	Inès Mess	24	Paris
Honduras	Sofía Valencia	25	Tegucigalpa
Indonesia	Keydi Bee	31	Bali
Japan	Saki Iwai	23	Miyazaki
Laos	Lisa Saengdala	24	Luang Prabang
Malaysia	Shazzyra Zahry	22	Kuala Lumpur
Mexico	Khloe Ríos-Wyatt	34	Jojutla
Myanmar	Adlar Z	23	Yangon
New Zealand	Fee Frans	27	Auckland
Nicaragua	Amaya Rivera	25	Managua
Peru	Dayalid Coronado	24	Lima
Philippines	Red Spiegelman	24	Pampanga
Puerto Rico	Vicky Morales	26	San Juan
Singapore	Antasha Zahra Ulhaq	27	Singapore
Spain	Nikole Ramírez	25	Madrid
Taiwan	Ying Fei Wang	26	Taipei
Thailand	Theerachaya Pimkitidaj	29	Chiang Mai
Turkey	Naz Duru	23	Istanbul
United States	Lo Colby	35	Oʻahu
Venezuela	Danielal Marquina	24	Mérida
Vietnam	Minh Anh Nguyễn	24	Hanoi
