= Aniceto Sobrepeña =

Filipino banker (1953–2026)

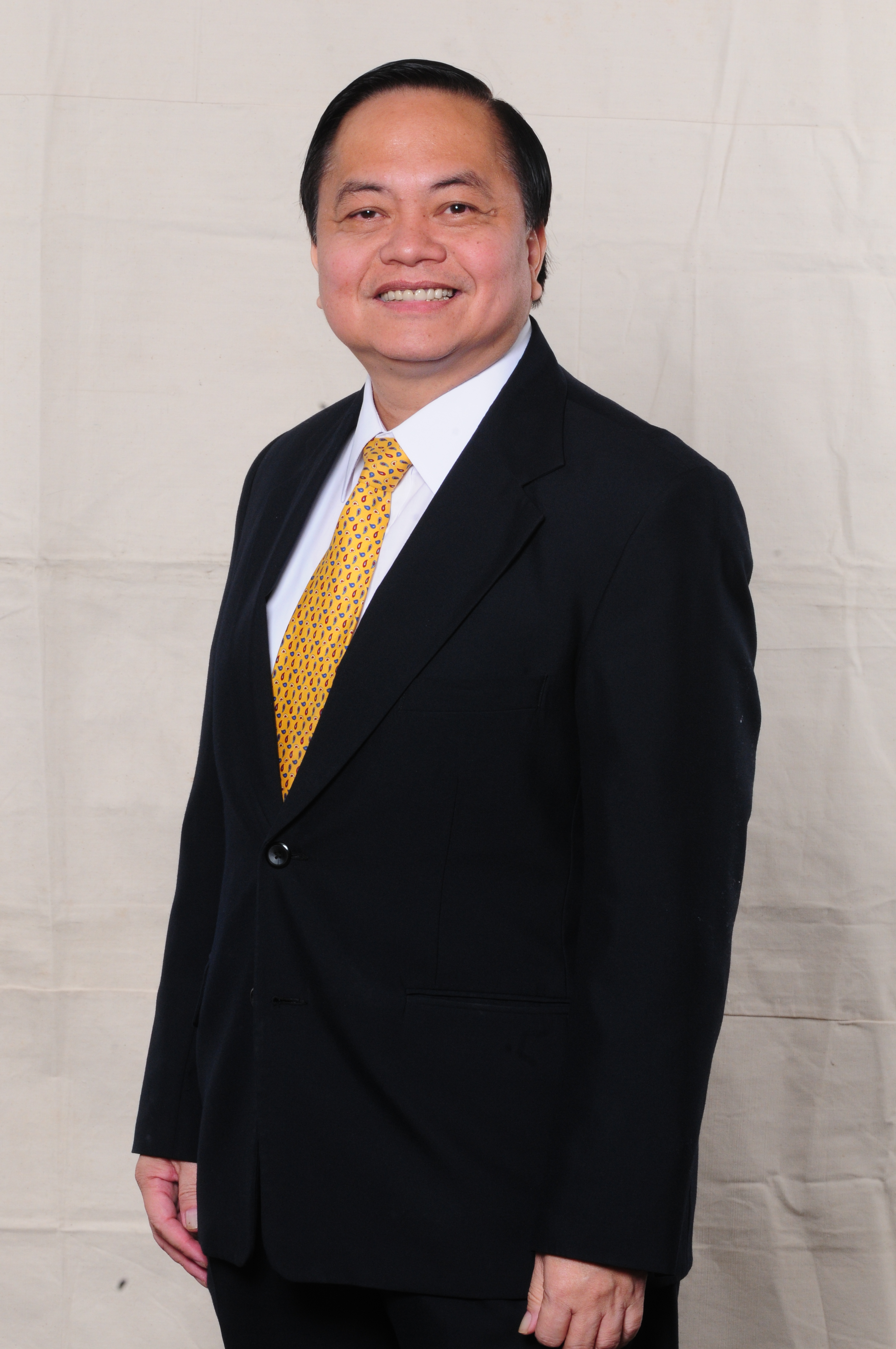
- Sobrepeña in 2007

Cabinet Secretary of the Philippines
- In office January 5, 1990 – July 19, 1991
- President: Corazon Aquino
- Preceded by: Jose de Jesus

Deputy Director-General, National Economic and Development Authority
- President: Fidel V. Ramos

Personal details
- Born: Aniceto Mangahas Sobrepeña; June 17, 1953 San Jose, Nueva Ecija, Philippines
- Died: January 11, 2026 (aged 72)
- Spouse: Anna Isabel Crisóstomo
- Children: 3
- Education: Ateneo de Manila University (AB); Williams College (MA)

Aniceto Mangahas "Chito" Sobrepeña (June 17, 1953 – January 11, 2026) was a Filipino businessman, civil servant and civic leader. He was the president of the Metrobank Foundation. Sobrepeña was also the executive director of GT Foundation, vice chairman of the Federal Land, vice chairman of the Manila Doctors Hospital, Inc. and a member of the board of trustees of the Toyota Motor Philippines School of Technology, Inc. (TMP Tech). Prior to working in the private sector, Sobrepeña was concurrently a cabinet secretary in the Office of the President and Head of the Presidential Management Staff under President Corazon C. Aquino, as well as Deputy Director-General of the National Economic and Development Authority (NEDA) under President Fidel V. Ramos.

== Early life and education ==
Sobrepeña was born on June 17, 1953, in San Jose City in northern Nueva Ecija. He graduated First Honorable Mention from high school in 1969, and finished his political science degree, cum laude and with departmental honors, at Ateneo de Manila University in 1973. Later, he acquired his Certificate in Development Economics from the University of the Philippines School of Economics (UPSE) as a National Economic and Development Authority (NEDA) Scholar in 1974. He completed his Master of Arts in development economics from Williams College in Massachusetts, as a NEDA-USAID scholar in 1977.

He was a member of the Federation of Free Farmers during the pre-Martial Law era, advocating land reform even though his family owned substantial tracts of land in the province. He was recruited to join the NEDA right after graduation, and after finishing his training at the UPSE, he volunteered for an assignment serving in the Eastern Visayas Regional Development Council from 1974 to 1976.

== Public service ==
Beginning as a research assistant, Sobrepeña became a director in the national government at the age of 27, steering the Policy Coordination Staff of NEDA. He later joined the Office of the President as undersecretary before being appointed as cabinet secretary and head of the Presidential Management Staff (PMS) from 1990 to 1992 during the transition to democratic governance, Sobrepeña was the youngest member of the Aquino Cabinet at 36. His last appointment in government was during the term of President Fidel V. Ramos as Deputy-Director General of the NEDA from 1992 to 1995.

His government service of more than 22 years was marked with achieving the highest rank in the Career Executive Service Officers (CESO) corps (Rank I) from the Career Executive Service Board. He directed and supervised provision of technical and conference support to the President and the cabinet through the Cabinet Assistance System (CAS), including coordination of state visits. His responsibilities at NEDA included managing reviews of proposed economic policies, and the formulation of regional and physical development plans. When President Aquino championed NGOs and people's organizations in governance and development, Chito served on the Philippine Council for Sustainable Development (PCSD).

== Private sector ==
Sobrepeña was president of the Metrobank Foundation, Inc. (MBFI), the corporate social responsibility (CSR) arm of the Metrobank Group for more than 17 years. He implemented CSR programs in sectors such as education, visual arts, health care, the judiciary, police and military, and grant-making to various socio-civic and charitable institutions in the Philippines and the wider Asia-Pacific.

Under Sobrepeña's leadership, Metrobank was declared winner in the Corporate Social Responsibility Program category of the 1999 Asian Banking Awards, for the significant impact of MBFI's different programs on the country's development efforts. Since joining the Metrobank Group, MBFI has won international awards and almost 50 awards from Philippine public affairs organizations and government bodies.

In 2012, MBFI was awarded the Distinguished Sesquicentennial (150 years) Gawad Rizal Awards from the National Historical Commission of the Philippines. The institution was similarly recognized as Quezon City's Most Outstanding Organization for 2012 as the leading CSR institution for a leading banking enterprise.

In 2012, the United Nations Educational, Scientific and Cultural Organization (UNESCO) invited Sobrepeña to Paris to speak on the initiatives of MBFI in promoting the status of teachers, especially the 28-year search for Outstanding Teachers and the annual National Teachers’ Month celebrations. His being the only Asian panellist was seen as recognition of MBFI’s successful programs and the leadership of the institution in corporate social responsibility.

The De La Salle University conferred on the Foundation the Signum Ministerii(Sign of Service) Medal “in recognition of its various initiatives, programs and achievements toward the enhancement of the quality of life of and the promotion of a culture of excellence among Filipinos.” MBFI is the third recipient of the award after Church-run Radio Veritas in 1983, and the National Citizens' Movement for Free Elections (NAMFREL) in 1984.

== Personal life and death ==
Sobrepeña was married to Anna Isabel Crisóstomo, and together they had three children.

He was part of Ang Ligaya ng Panginoon (lit. “Joy of the Lord”), a Catholic Sword of the Spirit community based in Metro Manila. A member since 1982, he was involved in the community and its Partners-in-Mission, including Couples for Christ, Christ's Youth in Action, and the Brotherhood of Christian Businessmen and Professionals. He had also served as pastoral leader to single men, and with his wife Anna, conducted marriage enrichment workshops called "Intimacy Weekend".

Sobrepeña died at the Manila Doctors Hospital on January 11, 2026, at the age of 72 due to complications from pancreatic cancer.

== Awards and recognitions ==
The following are some of the awards and recognition given to Sobrepeña in the course of his private and government career:

- Career Executive Service Officer, Rank (the highest rank that the President of the Republic can appoint a civil servant; achieved through performance-based evaluation), 1991
- Katangi-tanging Huwaran ng Career Executive Service (CES Exemplars), Career Executive Service Board, 2008
- CEO (Communication Excellence in Organizations) Excel Award, International Association of Business Communicators Philippines, 2005
- Most Outstanding NEDA Official in the Central Office for CY 1993 (NEDA Director-General's Citation)
- Most Outstanding Citizen, San Jose City (Nueva Ecija), 20th Foundation Day Celebration, 1989
- Quezon City Most Outstanding Citizen for 2013, 74th Quezon City Founding Anniversary, 2013
- 2013 Rotary Golden Wheel Awardee for Corporate Social Responsibility Development, Rotary Club District 3780

== Bibliography ==
- “Aniceto ‘Chito’ Sobrepeña". Manila Bulletin http://www.mb.com.ph/articles/378062/aniceto-chito-sobrepe-a (accessed on November 15, 2012)
- “Executive Profile: Aniceto M. Sobrepeña” Businessweek http://investing.businessweek.com/research/stocks/people/person.asp?personId=11502822&ticker=MBT:PM&previousCapId=874909&previousTitle=METROPOLITAN%20BANK%20%26%20TRUST (accessed on November 15, 2012)
- “Profile Display Aniceto Sobrepeña” www.jesuitcommons.org/index.asp?bid=74&smid=21105 (accessed on November 15, 2012)
- “Interview: Aniceto Sobrepeña, President, Metrobank Foundation-Philippines” United Nations Educational, Scientific and Cultural Organization (UNESCO) http://www.unesco.org/new/en/education/themes/education-building-blocks/teacher-education/single-view/news/interview_aniceto_sobrepena_president_metrobank_foundation_philippines/ (accessed on November 15, 2012)
- “Entrevista: Aniceto Sobrepeña, Presidente de la Fundación Metrobank-Filipinas”. Organización de las Naciones Unidas para la Educación, la Ciencia y la Cultura (UNESCO) http://www.unesco.org/new/es/media-services/single-view/news/interview_aniceto_sobrepena_president_metrobank_foundation_philippines/ (accessed on November 15, 2012)
- “Interview - Aniceto Sobrepeña, Président de la Fundation Metrobank, Philippines”. Organisation des Nations Unies pour l’ėducation, la science et la culture (UNESCO) http://www.unesco.org/new/fr/media-services/single-view/news/interview_aniceto_sobrepena_president_metrobank_foundation_philippines/ (accessed on November 15, 2012)
- “DLSU confers Signum Ministerii to Metrobank Foundation”. SunStar http://www.sunstar.com.ph/manila/business/2013/02/20/dlsu-confers-signum-ministerii-metrobank-foundation-269166 (accessed on November 15, 2012)
- “Trustee: Aniceto Sobrepeña”. PinoyMe Foundation https://web.archive.org/web/20130717005449/http://www.pinoyme.com/who-we-are/people (accessed on November 15, 2012)
- “Sobrepena, Aniceto”. Reuters https://www.reuters.com/finance/stocks/officerProfile?symbol=MBT.PS&officerId=520665 (accessed on November 15, 2012)
- "Sobrepena, Aniceto". Manila Bulletin
- "CESDP Alumni". Career Executive Service Development Program http://dap.edu.ph/pmdp/index.php?option=com_content&view=article&id=33&Itemid=46 (accessed on July 16, 2013)
- "Board of Trustees". Local Government Academy https://web.archive.org/web/20130801143250/http://lga.gov.ph/board-trustees (accessed on July 16, 2013)
- "Aniceto M. Sobrepena". YouTube https://www.youtube.com/watch?v=wU7h9PPrqDc (accessed on July 16, 2013)
- "Mr. Aniceto M. Sobrepena. President, Metrobank Foundation". UNESCO http://mbfoundation.org.ph/docs/AMS-UNSECO-Paris-Powerpoint.pdf (accessed on July 16, 2013)
- "Aniceto "Chito" Sobrepena". Yahoo! News Philippines https://web.archive.org/web/20131029194300/http://ph.news.yahoo.com/aniceto-chito-sobrepe-021944123--finance.html (accessed on July 18, 2013)
- "Opening Remarks of President Aniceto Sobrepena". Search for the Country's Outstanding Policemen in Service (COPS) Awarding Ceremonies https://web.archive.org/web/20140913083230/http://www.cops.ph/cops-search/cops-speeches/306-opening-remarks-of-president-aniceto-sobrepena (accessed July 18, 2013)
- "‘Made of Gold’: Lavish book celebrates nearly 30 years of Metrobank art contest". Philippine Daily Inquirer http://lifestyle.inquirer.net/97825/made-of-gold-lavish-book-celebrates-nearly-30-years-of-metrobank-art-contest (accessed on July 18, 2013)
- "Thirteen Artists Awards Ceremony and Exhibit Opening at the CCP". Cultural Center of the Philippines (accessed on July 18, 2013)
- Chee Kee, Raoul J. "Chito Sobrepeña – Why giving back to society has been his life’s work" Philippine Daily Inquirer 18 Aug. 2013: Sunday Lifestyle. http://lifestyle.inquirer.net/120769/chito-sobrepena-why-giving-back-to-society-has-been-his-lifes-work#ixzz2cN5hq500 (accessed on August 20, 2013)
- Elmenzo, Marlene H. “The Power of Communication.” Newsbreak 13 Feb. 2006: 34. Print
- Icasiano, Aurelio “The Power of Empowerment” Metro Society Nov. 2012: Print
- Sobrepeña, Aniceto M. “A CESO Remembers: Serving Government with President Cory.” Public Manager (Official Magazine of the Career Executive Service) 2009: 13–14. Print
- Sobrepeña, Aniceto M. “In Great Company: CESDP Days of Remembrance.” Public Manager (Official Magazine of the Career Executive Service) Dec. 2008: 4–5. Print
- Sobrepeña, Aniceto M. “Response to an Excellent God” The Windhover (The Philippine Jesuit Magazine) 3rd Quarter 2004: 14–15. Print
