= Shooting of Mima Alicia =

2026 crime in the Philippines

- Lipata in 2026
- Location: Caloocan, Metro Manila, Philippines
- Date: July 17, 2026; ~3:00 am (UTC+8)
- Deaths: 1
- Injuries: 1
- Victims: Mima Alicia (died); Nelboy Lluz (injured)
- Assailant: 2 motorcycle-riding male
- Motive: Under investigation
- Accused: 6 (including 2 masterminds)
- Charges: Murder, frustrated murder (all 6 suspects); Illegal possession of firearms and of explosives (2 assailants)

Filipino political vlogger Alicia Lipata, known professionally as Mima Alicia (stylized as MiMa Alicia), was shot dead outside her residence in Caloocan on July 17, 2026.

== Background ==
Mima Alicia
- Born: Alicia Mira Lipata; June 20, 2002; Manila, Philippines
- Died: July 17, 2026 (aged 24); Caloocan, Metro Manila, Philippines
- Other name: Mia Fernandez
- Education: Vigo High School; Laoang National High School
- Occupation: Vlogger
- Partner: Nelboy Lluz

TikTok information
- Page: Alicia Comments
- Followers: 72.2 thousand

YouTube information
- Channel: Alicia Comments
- Years active: 2024–2026
- Subscribers: 363 thousand
- Views: 155 million
- Last updated: 23 July 2026

Alicia Mira Lipata (June 20, 2002 – July 17, 2026) was a Filipino vlogger who goes by the name Mima Alicia online and was 24-years old at the time of her death. She was focused on creating content focused on political commentary and was a supporter of the administration of the incumbent president Bongbong Marcos. She was also characterized as being critical against Vice President Sara Duterte and her allies. She maintained the YouTube channel, Alicia Comments which had 362,000 subscribers.

Mima Alicia was a member of the pro-administration content creator group United Vloggers and Influencers of the Philippines (UVIP).

She was in a relationship with Nelboy Lluz, her live-in partner.

== Death ==
On July 17, 2026, Mima Alicia and her partner Lluz arrived near their residence in Barangay 171 in Caloocan. Two gunmen riding motorcycles approached them with Alicia shot dead. Lluz also sustained injuries after sustaining multiple gunshots himself. According to a neighbor, the shooting occurred around 3:00 am with Lluz later rushed to the Camarin Doctors Hospital.

== Assailants and possible motive ==
The Philippine National Police (PNP) initially suspected that the killing of Mima Alicia was connected to her political content in social media, but later ruled out such motive. The police also suspects that an earlier death threat related to the vlogger's previous relationship could also be a possible angle. Later, the PNP said that her death was in connection with an alleged debt, amounting ₱8-million, which she owed from the alleged masterminds; and personal grudge as another possible motive is being investigated. On August 3, the PNP said that the killing had been solved as all six suspects had been identified and were charged of murder.

Department of the Interior and Local Government (DILG) Secretary Jonvic Remulla on July 21, 2026 said that the two suspects are linked to a criminal group "based in the south" and are in preparation for the two men's arrests.

The following day the police arrested the two men in Mabalacat, Pampanga—the gunman, a 58-year old male from Caloocan; and the motorcycle rider, a 48-year old male from Cavite. Both men were charged for murder, frustrated murder, illegal possession of firearms, and illegal possession of explosives.

Another suspect identified as "A.F.", an alleged middleman, surrendered to the city police of Mabalacat on July 24.

The police later revealed that the three suspects are known hired killers who have been linked to at least ten previous incidents in Central Luzon and Metro Manila since 2016, particularly robbery and firearms cases where the rider was allegedly involved; and the firearm used in these was the same used in the killing. Meanwhile, the alleged gunman, previously served as a security personnel for the late drug lord in Iloilo, was involved in a firearms case and a dismissed murder complaint. The police further stated that the middleman transferred money to the gunman, and that the contract price for the killing was ₱250,000.

Meanwhile, three more suspects remain at large, including another middleman identified as "C.B.", and two masterminds—a businessman and his partner—whose names are still undisclosed.

== Impact and analysis ==
Political analyst Ronald Llamas described Mima Alicia's killing to be part of a "culture of violence" of the Diehard Duterte Supporters alleging that supporters of the Duterte family are emboldened to kill critics, citing the 2022 killing of Percy Lapid. Meanwhile Senator Risa Hontiveros sought the help of the National Bureau of Investigation over the "wave" of death threats hurled against her in light of Mima Alicia's killing.
