= Cavite Bus Rapid Transit =

Busway in Cavite, Philippines

Overview
- Status: Under construction
- Began service: 2028; 2 years' time (planned)

Route
- Route type: Bus rapid transit
- Locale: Cavite, Philippines
- Termini: 4 (planned)
- Length: 29 km (18 mi)
- Stops: 47 (planned)

The Cavite Bus Rapid Transit (CBRT or the Cavite BRT) is a bus rapid transit (BRT) system underconstruction in the province of Cavite in the Philippines.

== History ==
Megaworld and the Maplecrest Group submitted an unsolicited proposal to the provincial government of Cavite in April 2023, suggesting the construction of a bus rapid transit which will serve parts of the province and connect it to Metro Manila via the Parañaque Integrated Terminal Exchange (PITX). The public–private partnership was formalized by 2024.

Megaworld publicized its receipt of the notice of award from the Cavite government on January 8, 2025. On January 26, the three parties signed a joint venture agreement for the Cavite Bus Rapid Transit (CBRT).

To be built in two phases, the CBRT is scheduled to be completed by 2028.

== Planned stops ==
Cavite Bus Rapid Transit phases
Phase	Terminal(s)	Stop(s)	Notes
Phase 1	3	27	Serves Kawit, Imus, General Trias, and Tanza
Phase 2	1	20	Serves Trece Martires, conntects to the Parañaque Integrated Terminal Exchange
Total	4	47	
