= Sex trafficking in the Philippines =

Sex trafficking in the Philippines is human trafficking for the purpose of sexual exploitation and slavery that occurs in the Republic of the Philippines. The Philippines is a country of origin and, to a lesser extent, a destination and transit for sexually trafficked persons.

Filipino citizens, primarily women and girls, have been sex trafficked to the various provinces of the Philippines, as well as other countries in Asia and different continents. Some are trafficked using student, intern, and exchange program visas. Children and people in poverty and with low education levels are vulnerable. Other vulnerable groups include indigenous peoples and those displaced by typhoons and conflict and violence. Sex trafficked victims are deceived and forced into prostitution, marriages, pregnancies, and unfree labour. Their documents, including passports, are often confiscated. They are threatened and tied or locked-up and experience physical and psychological trauma. Many suffer from post traumatic stress disorder and nightmares. They contract sexually transmitted diseases from rapes, and abuse, malnutrition, and poor living conditions, including rooms with little ventilation, are common. Cybersex or online sex trafficking and victims being in pornography is a significant problem. Sex trafficking victims are sometimes forced to perform sex acts on live webcams. Some have been coerced into bestiality. Traffickers use many different internet and social media sites and apps, as well as email, to lure victims.

Officials and police have been complicit. A number of traffickers are members of or facilitated by criminal syndicates. Some government officials and workers, as well as foreigners, have profited from sex trafficking in the Philippines. The perpetrators are sometimes the victims' family members and friends. Pedophiles travel to the country for child sex tourism.

The scale of sex trafficking in the Philippines is difficult to know because of the dearth of data. Corruption is pervasive. The government has been criticized for poor anti-sex trafficking law enforcement in some areas and not providing enough victim protections and rehabilitation services.

== Cybersex trafficking ==
The United Nations Children's Fund (UNICEF) identified the Philippines as the global epicenter of cybersex trafficking. The Office of Cybercrime within the Philippines Department of Justice receives hundreds of thousands of tips of videos and images of sexually exploited Filipino children on the internet. The Philippine National Police, along with its Women and Children Protection Center (WCPC), Philippine Internet Crimes Against Child Center (PICACC), Philippine InterAgency Council Against Trafficking (IACAT, Department of Justice (Philippines), and Department of Social Welfare and Development fight cybersex trafficking in the country. Rancho ni Cristo in Cebu is a shelter devoted exclusively to rehabilitating children of live streaming sexual abuse. Children in the shelter are provided food, medical care, counselling, mentoring and life skills training.

== 'Juicy bars' ==
Filipino women and girls have been trafficked out the Philippines to South Korea and become sex slaves in 'juicy bars' that cater to military servicemen and contractors in United States Forces Korea.

== Non-governmental organizations ==
Destiny Rescue Pilipinas, an operational arm of Destiny Rescue International, rescues sex trafficked persons in the Philippines.

The International Justice Mission (IJM) works to combat cybersex trafficking in the Philippines.
