= 2026 General Trias school stabbing =

2026 school stabbing in Cavite, Philippines

- Location: 14.3793°N 120.8825°E; Bethel Academy, Santa Clara, General Trias, Cavite, Philippines
- Date: 16 June 2026
- Attack type: School stabbing, Mass stabbing
- Weapon: Kitchen knife
- Injuries: 7
- Victim: Grade 5 students
- Motive: Under investigation
- Accused: 14-year-old female student

On 16 June 2026, a 14-year-old female student stabbed and injured seven Grade 5 pupils using a kitchen knife at Bethel Academy of Gen. Trias Cavite Inc. in General Trias, Cavite, Philippines.

== Background ==
=== Bethel Academy ===
Bethel Academy is a private school located in Barangay Sta. Clara, General Trias, Cavite. The institution provides elementary and secondary education within the same campus. Security measures at the school primarily consisted of monitoring at the main gates.

== Incident ==
On the morning of 16 June 2026, teachers and staff at Bethel Academy attended a faculty meeting. During the meeting, a Grade 5 classroom was left without adult supervision.

At around 8:30 a.m., a 14-year-old female Grade 8 student, reported to be a recent transferee at the school, went to her classroom on the second floor and left her school bag there before going down to the ground floor. She entered the Grade 5 classroom and attacked the pupils inside with a kitchen knife. Seven students, aged 10 to 11, sustained stab wounds, primarily to their backs.

A teacher who was alerted to the incident confronted the student, ordered her to drop the weapon, and restrained her. The school administration then contacted local police and the Department of Social Welfare and Development (DSWD).

== Victims ==
Seven Grade 5 students, aged 10 to 11, were injured in the attack. All seven were brought to Divine Grace Medical Center for treatment. Two of them sustained injuries severe enough to require surgery and were transferred to a larger medical facility.

As of late June 2026, the seven students were reported to be in stable condition and recovering. Their identities have been withheld by authorities to protect the privacy of the minors involved.

== Perpetrator ==
The suspect is a 14-year-old female student who had recently transferred to Bethel Academy. She was in Grade 8 at the time of the attack.

=== Arrest and custody ===
After being restrained by a teacher, the student was taken into custody by local police. Authorities turned her over to the General Trias City Social Welfare and Development Office. She was subsequently brought to a mental health facility for medical and psychological evaluation. Because the suspect is a minor, her identity has not been publicly disclosed.

=== Motive and investigation ===
As of late June 2026, investigators had not established a confirmed motive. Philippine National Police (PNP) spokesperson Colonel Allen Rae Co said there were unconfirmed reports that the attack may have been connected to bullying. Earlier police statements, however, said there was no indication the attack was linked to bullying, gang activity, or any prior conflict between students.

Co also stated that the student was initially found to be possibly suffering from depression, though this had not yet been formally confirmed. Authorities are also investigating how the student brought the knife onto school premises.

== Aftermath ==
=== School response ===
On 17 June 2026, Bethel Academy released a statement saying the school community was "deeply saddened and shaken" by the incident. The school said it was coordinating with the families of the victims and assisting with medical expenses.

On 21 June 2026, the school announced via its Facebook page that classes would shift to online learning from 22 to 26 June 2026, to allow time to put additional security measures in place before students returned to campus. Class schedules and Zoom meeting details were sent to parents and guardians by email.

Bethel Academy also stated that CCTV footage of the incident had been provided only to law enforcement for investigative purposes, and that it had not authorized the public release of the recording. The school cited the Data Privacy Act, the Cybercrime Prevention Act, and the Department of Education's Child Protection Policy as legal grounds against sharing the footage, and urged anyone who had saved or shared the video to delete it.

=== Medical and financial assistance ===
The General Trias City local government unit (LGU) covered all medical expenses for the hospitalized students. Mayor Luis Ferrer IV directed social workers to provide psychosocial intervention to the victims, their families, and other students who were present in the classroom during the attack.

On 24 June 2026, the DSWD Field Office CALABARZON provided ₱10,000 in financial assistance to each of the recovering students. DSWD social workers, together with LGU staff, visited the victims at their homes and in the hospital to deliver the aid.

=== Related school violence in 2026 ===
In the days following the Bethel Academy attack, Philippine schools saw further incidents of violence, prompting broader concern over student safety nationwide. On 19 June 2026, a senior high school student at Cavite National High School stabbed an 18-year-old fellow student following an argument. On 22 June 2026, the 2026 Tacloban school shooting left three students dead and 20 others wounded. These events prompted discussions in the national government regarding the implementation of metal detectors and the deployment of additional security personnel in both private and public schools.

== Reactions ==
=== Local government ===
General Trias Mayor Luis Ferrer IV confirmed via a Facebook post that the injured students had been brought to hospital, with two later transferred for surgery. He said the LGU would provide full medical support and directed social workers to assist all students affected, including those who witnessed the attack.

=== National authorities ===
PNP chief General Jose Melencio Nartatez said "Violence inside educational institutions is unacceptable" and directed the Cavite Provincial Police Office and Police Regional Office 4A to conduct a full investigation. He also ordered local police units to increase visibility around schools nationwide.

Nartatez directed the PNP Anti-Cybercrime Group to coordinate with social media platforms to restrict the spread of video footage from the attack, saying children involved in such incidents "deserve protection and support" and should not be subjected to public judgment or online harassment.

The Department of Education (DepEd) called on the public to respect the privacy and rights of the children involved and to avoid spreading unverified information. The Schools Division Office of General Trias City said it had coordinated with the police, the City Social Welfare and Development Office, barangay officials, and other agencies to ensure the safety of all learners and to facilitate a thorough investigation.

The Commission on Human Rights (CHR) announced a motu proprio investigation into the incident alongside other school violence cases that week. The CHR urged DepEd, the PNP, and local government units to review school safety protocols while keeping schools as spaces for learning rather than militarized environments.

=== Public and media ===
CCTV footage of the stabbing was leaked and circulated widely on social media. The General Trias City Police issued a public advisory against sharing, reposting, or uploading the videos, noting they were investigating the leak.

The Alliance of Concerned Teachers (ACT) said the incident exposed long-standing gaps in school staffing and student support systems, and called for the hiring of more security personnel and mental health professionals in schools.

Some legislators proposed lowering the Minimum Age of Criminal Responsibility (MACR) from 15 to 10 in response to the recent incidents. Child rights advocates opposed the proposal, arguing that children in conflict with the law need rehabilitation rather than criminal prosecution.

== See also ==
- 2026 Tacloban school shooting
- 2026 Ateneo de Zamboanga University shooting
- 2026 crimes in the Philippines
