= Chile–Philippines relations =

- Chile: Philippines

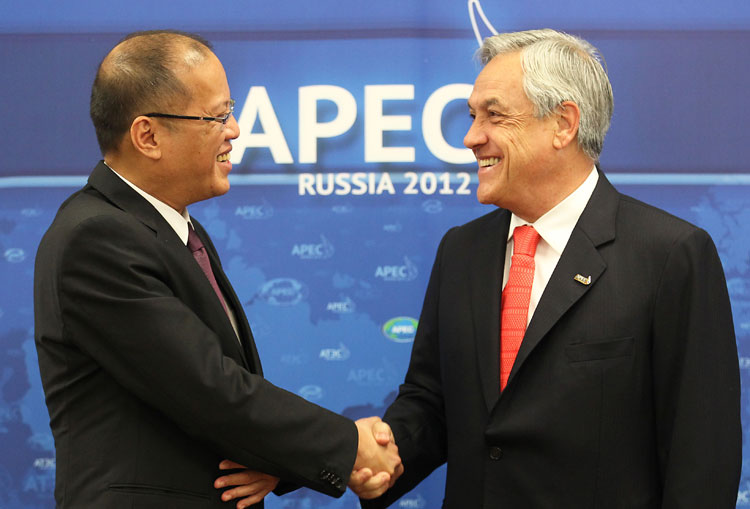
President Benigno Aquino III (left) with President Sebastian Piñera during the 20th Asia-Pacific Economic Cooperation (APEC) Leaders' Summit in 2012

Chile–Philippines relations are the interstate and bilateral relations between Chile and the Philippines. Both nations were both parts of the Spanish Empire and during colonial times they freely traveled to each other's geographic location.

== History ==
Both Chile and the Philippines have the presence of similar races as the Philippines was where Latin Americans, Spaniards, and Malayo-Polynesians lived together which is the same case in Chile especially at their Westernmost province, the Easter Islands which was originally settled by Malayo-Polynesians and followed by Spaniards and Latin Americans; nowadays, Easter Islanders are the only Malayo-Polynesians who are fluent Spanish second-language speakers. During the Spanish colonial era, the Manila Galleons traded goods between Asia and Latin America and merchants from the Philippines distributed Asian goods all the way to Santiago at Chile. The Chileans were also in the Philippines and Chileans were one of the nationalities of Latin American officers and soldiers that supported the Philippines’ short-lived Emperor, Andrés Novales, in his revolt against Spain. Later, the Chilean independence leader of Irish descent Bernardo O'Higgins once planned to expand Chile by liberating the Philippines from Spain and incorporating the islands. In this regard, he tasked the Scottish naval officer, Lord Thomas Cochrane, in a letter dated on November 12, 1821, expressing his plan to conquer Guayaquil, the Galapagos Islands, and the Philippines. There were preparations, but the plan didn't push through because O'Higgins was exiled. Nevertheless, in the middle of the 19th century there was another plan by Chilean officials to also assist in the Philippine Revolution and the Philippine-American War. by sending an armada across the Pacific. However, the plan also did not come to fruition. Nevertheless, currently there is flourishing bilateral relations between Chile and the Philippines. Diplomatic relations between Chile and the Philippines began in 1854 when Chile opened a consulate in Binondo, Manila. But the formal relations established on July 4, 1946, the day when the Philippines officially gained its independence from the United States.

== Relations ==
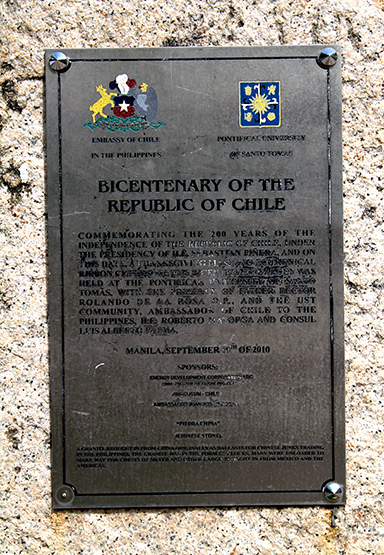
Plaque in the University of Santo Tomas commemorating the Bicentenary of the Republic of Chile.

According to Philippine President Benigno Aquino III, Chile and the Philippines share "unique experiences" with their Spanish colonizations, their predominance in Christianity, and their frequent occurrence of natural disasters as both countries are located in the Ring of Fire.

In 2012, Chile and the Philippines were eyeing partnerships in mining and geothermal energy, Chilean President Sebastian Piñera shared stories about his country to Philippine President Benigno Aquino III during a bilateral meeting in Vladivostok, where the APEC summit was held. President Piñera also mentioned to President Aquino that his country needs English teachers, a potential jobs that awaits Filipinos in Chile. In that year also, saying that there were 318 Spanish-trained basic education teachers in the Philippines, Philippine Secretary of Education Armin Luistro announced an agreement was in process with the Chilean government to train Filipino school teachers in Spanish. In exchange, the Philippines will help the Chileans with their English fluency.

== State visits ==
Chilean President Michelle Bachelet undertook a state visit to the Philippines on November 16, 2015, on the sidelines of the APEC Economic Leaders' Meeting in Manila. She met with Philippine President Benigno Aquino III at the Malacañang Palace, the two of whom also witnessed the signing of several bilateral agreements on disaster risk reduction and emergency management cooperation between their governments and agreed to pursue talks for a free trade agreement in an effort to increase trade and investment between Chile and the Philippines.

== Resident diplomatic missions ==
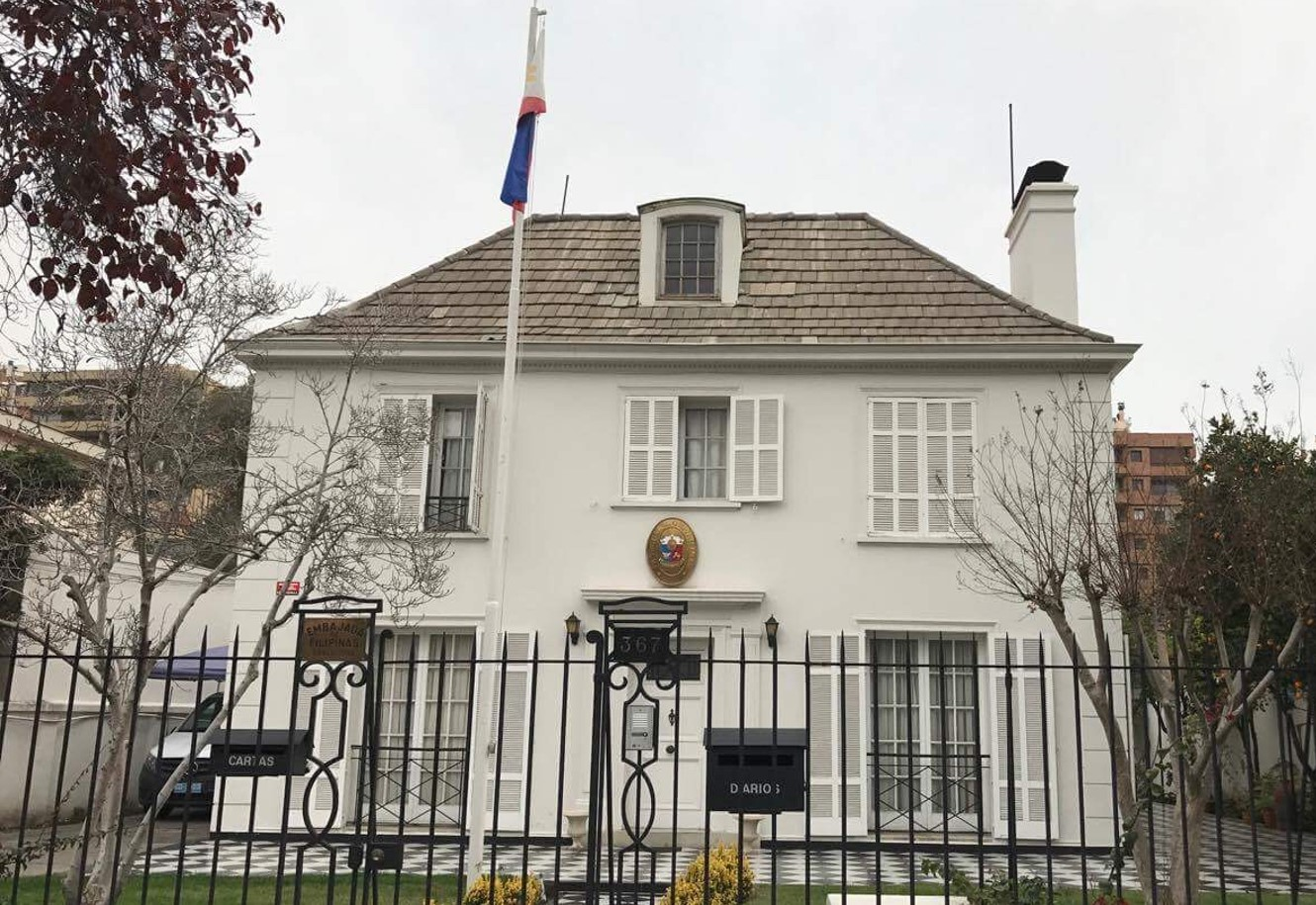
Embassy of the Philippines in Santiago

- Chile has an embassy in Manila.
- Philippines has an embassy in Santiago.

== See also ==
- Embassy of the Philippines, Santiago
