= Haron Abas =

Member of the Bangsamoro Transition Authority Parliament
- In office February 22. 2019 – June 28, 2026
- Appointed by: Rodrigo Duterte; Bongbong Marcos
- Chief Minister: Murad Ebrahim; Abdulraof Macacua

Personal details
- Born: Haron Muhammad Abas; Unknown Datu Piang, Maguindanao, Philippines
- Died: June 28, 2026 Davao City, Philippines
- Occupation: Politician

Military service
- Allegiance: Moro Islamic Liberation Front
- Battles/wars: Moro conflict

Haron Muhammad Abas, also known by his nom de guerre Muhammad Ameen, was a Filipino rebel and later politician.

== Early life and education ==
Haron Muhammad Abas was born in Magaslong in Datu Piang, Maguindanao. He is from a prominent Maguindanaoan clan. He studied at the Pagatin Elementary School and later the Notre Dame of Dulawan for high school.

He obtained a bachelor's degree in political science and law degree at the Manuel L. Quezon University in 1972, taking his master's degree in public administration at the Cotabato City State Polytechnic College (now Cotabato State University).

== Moro Islamic Liberation Front ==
At the Moro Islamic Liberation Front (MILF), Abas was known by the nom de guerre Muhammad Ameen and fought for the self-determination of the Moro people. He has been the secretary of the MILF Central Committee since 1988 under MILF founder Hashim Salamat and later under chairperson Murad Ebrahim.

== Bangsamoro government ==
Prior to the establishment of the Bangsamoro autonomous region in 2019, Abas served as a commissioner of the Bangsamoro Transition Commission in early 2017 which made the draft for the eventual Bangsamoro Organic Law.

Abas then became a member of the Bangsamoro Transition Authority, which served as the interim Bangsamoro Parliament from 2019.

== Death ==
Abas died on June 28, 2026 in a hospital in Davao City due to a lingering illness with his remains buried in Maguindanao del Norte.
