= Navotas Sanitary Landfill =

Sanitary Landfill in Navotas, Philippines

Coordinates: 14°42′03.4″N 120°54′43.4″E

The Navotas Sanitary Landfill is a non-operational landfill in Navotas, Metro Manila, Philippines.

== History ==
Historical landfills in Navotas
- 1 Tanza CDF
- 2 Navotas Sanitary Landfill

=== Site C4 dumpsite ===
The local government of Navotas previously maintained a small dumpsite in Bagumbayan North along the C4 Road. It operated from 1996 to October 2002.It was characterized as a waste transfer station.

=== Tanza CDF ===
The C4 dumpsite was later superseded by the Tanza controlled disposal facility (CDF) in Barangay Tanza. The setting up of the Tanza facility happened during the administration of Mayor Toby Tiangco as early as 2001 amidst a garbage crisis in Metro Manila. It was met with opposition from nearby residents, mostly fishpond owners who are supported by leftist groups which expressed concerns of potential pollution.

The facility which started accepting garbage in 2004 had a maximum load of around 500,000 tons. It served the town as well as the city of Manila. The dumpsite was operated by the Philippine Ecology Systems Corporation (Phileco).

The operations of the Tanza CDF was disrupted from April to November 2005. After groups based in the neighboring town of Obando, Bulacan set up a barricade at the Binuangan River.

The Tanza CDF was mandated to close by February 16, 2006 as per the Ecological Solid Waste Management Act of 2000.

=== Navotas Sanitary Landfill ===
The Navotas Sanitary Landfill was set up to replace the Tanza CDF. The dumping ground which began operation in 2006 was also managed by Phileco.

A court-approved expropriation in 2023 turned over the property to the San Miguel Aerocity Inc. (SMAI) for the proposed New Manila International Airport. Phileco closed the landfill on August 26, 2025 ahead of its franchise expiration in December. Phileco vacated the facility in February 2026.

==== 2026 fire ====
On April 10, 2026, a fire broke out at the closed Navotas Sanitary Landfill at around 7:56pm (UTC+8). The Bureau of Fire Protection declared the fire was under control on April 12. However fire still persists on the site. Half of the fire was extinguished by April 28.

Smog from the fire has affected various parts of Metro Manila. Around 500 people living on nearby islands were evacuated away from the landfill.

== Facilities ==
The Navotas Sanitary Landfill is hosted on an island and covers an area of 41.121 ha (101.61 acres). It was billed as the first bay area type engineered sanitary landfill in the Philippines.

The Vitas Marine Loading Station in Tondo transports garbage from Manila to the Navotas Sanitary Landfill via the sea.
