= Sophia Senoron =

Filipino actress, host, model and a beauty pageant contestant

Sophia Señoron
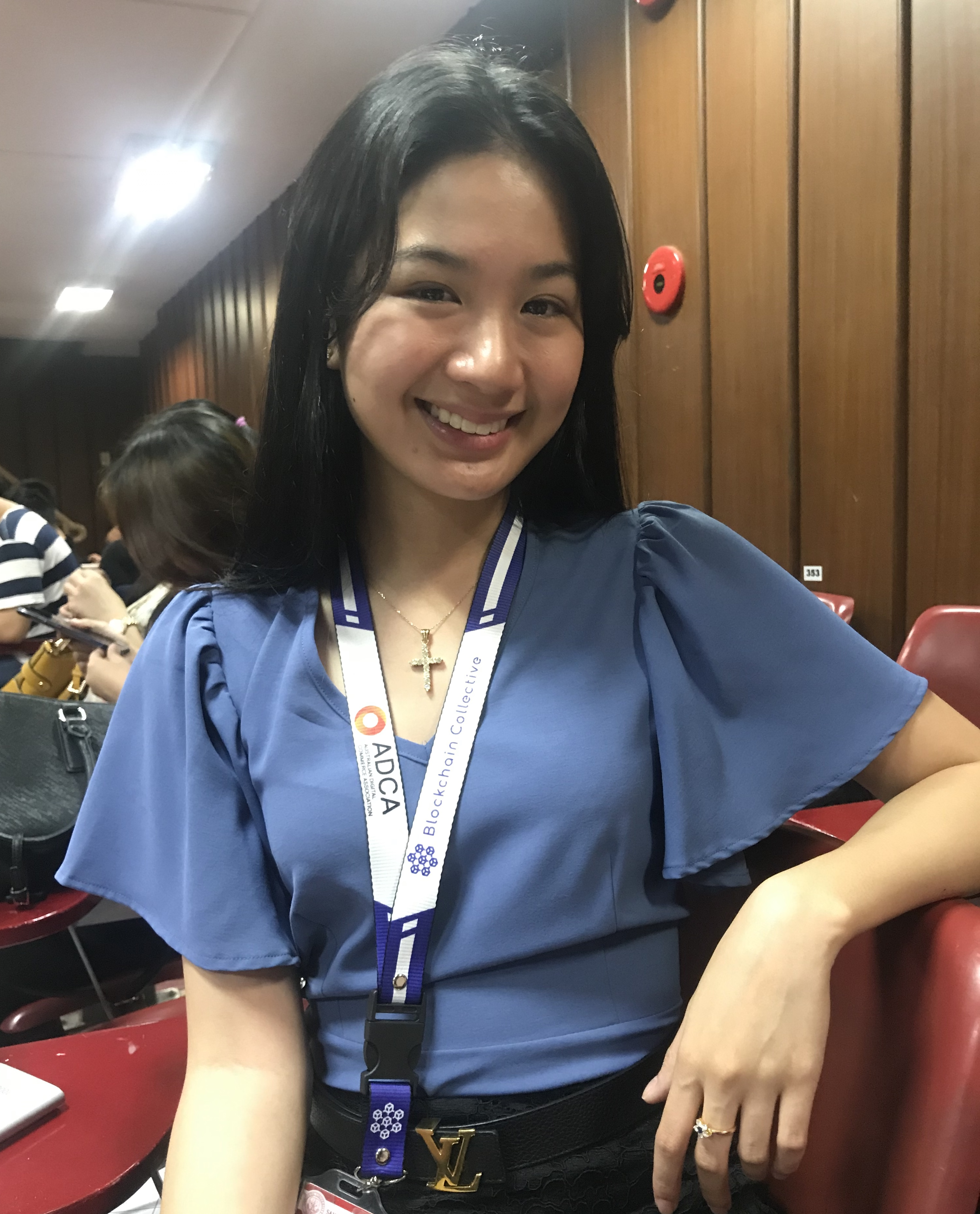
- Señoron, Miss Multinational 2017
- Born: October 8, 1999 (age 27); California, United States
- Education: San Beda University
- Occupations: Actress; host; model
- Height: 1.63 m (5 ft 4 in)
- Beauty pageant titleholder
- Title: Miss Multinational Philippines 2017; Miss Multinational 2017
- Hair color: Black
- Eye color: Black
- Major competitions: Miss World Philippines 2017 (Winner - Miss Multinational Philippines 2017); Miss Multinational 2017 (Winner)

Sophia Señoron (Note: Sophia Señoron was born in the United States of America. Thus, she does not possess her mother's maiden name which is Sordan.) (born October 8, 1999) is a Filipino actress, host, model, and beauty pageant titleholder. She won Miss Multinational 2017 on February 24, 2018, in New Delhi, India, becoming the first representative from the Philippines to win the title. She was also the first-ever Miss Multinational titleholder and the youngest Filipino representative in an international beauty pageant.

== Pageantry and showbiz ==
=== Miss World Philippines 2017 ===
Sophia participated in the national pageant, Miss World Philippines 2017 held on September 3, 2017, at the Mall of Asia Arena, Pasay, Philippines. At the end of the event, she was crowned as Miss Multinational Philippines 2017 becoming the first representative of Philippines to Miss Multinational pageant.

=== Miss Multinational 2017 ===
Sophia represented Philippines at Miss Multinational 2017 held on February 24, 2018, at the Kingdom of Dreams, Gurgaon, India where she was declared as the winner becoming the first ever titleholder of Miss Multinational pageant. During the competition, she also won the awards for Best in Interview, Miss Environment and Miss Speech.

=== Post-Miss Multinational, acting and hosting career ===
Senoron made her acting debut on the 2018 film Walwal.

She later signed a contract with GMA Network, along with fellow beauty queens Michelle Dee and Laura Lehmann on July 2, 2018.

In February 2021, Senoron started becoming a host in the 96th season of NCAA, along with sports anchor and fellow Sparkle artist Martin Javier.

In 2022, she became part of the cast of the Philippine television sitcom Pepito Manaloto as Cara.

Senoron became part of Voltes V: Legacy in 2023, as she portray the role of Ally.

== Filmography ==
=== Film ===
Year	Title	Role	Note(s)	Ref.
2018	Walwal	Shelby	Debut film	
2023	Voltes V: Legacy – The Cinematic Experience	Ally Chan	Supporting role	
2024	G! LU		Supporting role	

=== Television ===
Year	Title	Role	Note(s)	Ref.
2017	Tonight with Arnold Clavio	Herself (guest)	with Laura Lehmann and Winwyn Marquez	
2018	Mard	Herself (guest)		
2018	Cain at Abel	Julie		
2019	Taste Buddies	Herself (guest)		
2021	I Can See You: On My Way to You!	Jackie	Supporting role	
2021	Mars Pa More	Herself (guest)	with Martin Javier	
2021	Rise Up Stronger: The Road To NCAA Season 96	Herself (host)	with Martin Javier	
2021	NCAA Season 96 - Rise Up Stronger: Opening Ceremony	Herself (host)	with Martin Javier, Gabbi Garcia, and Khalil Ramos	
2021	Magpakailanman	Marian	Episode: "Pasaway na Iskolar"	
2022	Magpakailanman	Samantha	Episode: "Footless and Fearless - The Diego Garcia Story"	
2022	Game On!: NCAA Season 97	Herself (host)	with Martin Javier	
2022	NCAA Season 97: Stronger Together, Buo ang Puso - Opening Ceremony	Herself (host)	with Martin Javier, Rabiya Mateo, and Manolo Pedrosa	
2022	NCAA Season 97 volleyball tournaments	Herself (host)		
2022	Pepito Manaloto: Tuloy ang Kuwento	Cara		
2022	Mano Po Legacy: The Flower Sisters	young Aurora Ty-Chua		
2023	Voltes V: Legacy	Ally Chan	Supporting role	
2023	Walang Matigas na Pulis sa Matinik na Misis	Jessica (guest)		
2024	Abot-Kamay na Pangarap	Daphne	Recurring role	

== Notes ==
Awards and achievements
Preceded by First Winner	Miss Multinational; 2017	Succeeded by (United States) Daniela Nieto
Preceded by First Winner	Miss Multinational Philippines; 2017	Succeeded by Kimi Mugford
