= Michelle Dee =

Filipino actress, model, and beauty pageant titleholder (born 1995)

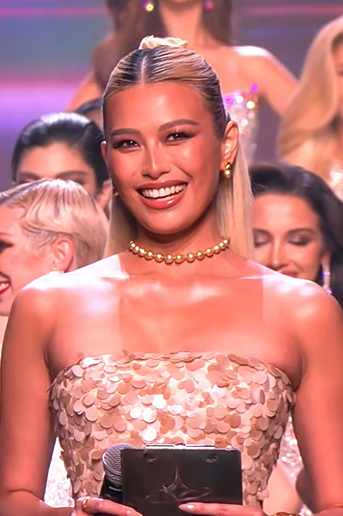
- Dee in 2026
- Born: Michelle Daniela Marquez Dee; April 24, 1995 (age 31); Makati, Philippines
- Education: De La Salle University; (BS Psychology)
- Occupations: Actress; model; television presenter; talk show host
- Height: 5 ft 10 in (1.78 m)
- Mother: Melanie Marquez
- Relatives: Dee C. Chuan (grand-uncle); Joey Marquez (uncle); Wilson Lee Flores (cousin); Winwyn Marquez (cousin); Zia Marquez (cousin)
- Beauty pageant titleholder
- Title: Miss World Philippines 2019; Miss Universe Philippines Tourism 2022; Miss Universe Philippines 2023
- Major competitions: Miss World Philippines 2019; (Winner); Miss World 2019; (Top 12); Miss Universe Philippines 2022; (Top 2 – Miss Universe Philippines Tourism 2022); Miss Universe Philippines 2023; (Winner); Miss Universe 2023; (Top 10); (Spirit of Carnival Award); (Voice for Change Winner); (Fan Vote Winner); (Best National Costume); MGI All Stars 2nd Edition; (TBD)

Michelle Daniela Marquez Dee (Tagalog: [miˈʃɛl dɐˈɲɛlɐ maɾˈkɛs di]; born April 24, 1995) is a Filipino actress, model, TV host, and beauty pageant titleholder who was crowned Miss Universe Philippines 2023. She represented the Philippines at the Miss Universe 2023 competition in El Salvador, where she placed in the Top 10 and won four special awards.

Dee previously won Miss World Philippines 2019. She represented the Philippines at the Miss World 2019 pageant in London, England, where she finished in the top 12.

She is set to compete in the second edition of MGI All Stars.

== Early life and education ==
Michelle Daniela Marquez Dee was born in Makati, Metro Manila, Philippines on April 24, 1995, to businessman, film producer, and former actor Frederick "Derek" Dee, and to actress, author, former supermodel, and beauty queen Melanie Marquez, who won Miss International 1979. Through her father, Dee is a third-generation Chinese Filipino.

Her paternal grand-uncle was Chinabank founder Dee C. Chuan, who immigrated from China to the Philippines in 1901. Her grandfather Dee K. Chiong was a former Senior Vice President of Chinabank, while her paternal grandmother, heiress and philanthropist Regina Y. Dee, was the daughter of Yu Hung-chun, who served as premier of Taiwan. His paternal cousin Wilson Lee Flores is the owner of Kamuning Bakery Cafe. Former PBA player Joey Marquez is her maternal uncle. Dee's maternal cousin and Joey's daughter is an actress and fellow beauty queen Winwyn Marquez, who won Reina Hispanoamericana in 2017.

Dee has one sister, Maxine Dee, and four maternal half-siblings: Manuelito, the son of actor and senator Lito Lapid; Mazen, now 33, was diagnosed with autism, the son of her mother with Arab sheik partner; Abraham; and Adam, who was diagnosed with "delay syndrome, sons of her mother with husband Adam Lawyer. She spent a considerable time of her childhood in their family ranch in Utah, United States, during summers and family vacations. Dee grew up loving farm animals and enjoying the countryside, both in Utah and in her family's hacienda in Mabalacat, Pampanga.

She attended the De La Salle University in Manila and graduated with a degree in psychology. In 2021, Dee completed her certificate program in entrepreneurship essentials from the Harvard Business School.

== Pageantry ==
=== Miss World Philippines 2019 ===
On September 15, 2019, Dee was crowned Miss World Philippines 2019 at the Smart Araneta Coliseum in Quezon City, Metro Manila, the Philippines. The finals night comprised competitions in swimwear, evening gown, and two question and answer rounds. She competed with and won over thirty-nine other delegates, and was crowned by outgoing Miss World Philippines 2018 Katarina Sonja Rodriguez by the end of the event. During the competition, Dee won six special awards: Miss Sportswoman by Fila, Miss GCOX, Miss Best Skin by Cathy Valencia, Miss Bench, Miss Myra E, and Miss Bluewater Day Spa. In the semifinal question and answer round, host Laura Lehmann asked Dee about the lessons and pieces of advice her mother, model and Miss International 1979 Melanie Marquez, gave her in her preparations for her first-ever beauty pageant competition. Dee replied:

The most important advice my mom gave me was to be myself. I'm not here trying to replicate her, but I'm trying to shine as my own woman. In doing so I've learned how to be strong, how to be confident in myself, and to embrace every single part of my being. So thank you, Mom, and thank you to everyone who came tonight and for supporting me. It means a lot to me.

In the final question and answer round, Dee was asked which invention from the last century she would love to make a comeback. She answered:

It would probably be polaroid films. I'm an avid lover of art. I love photography and I love the kind of energy and feel that polaroids give me. Just being able to lay everything out and go down memory lane is such a different feeling. Polaroids give me such a vibrant and positive energy.

=== Miss World 2019 ===
As Miss World Philippines 2019, Dee represented the Philippines in the Miss World 2019 competition at ExCel in London, England on December 14, 2019. During the preliminaries, Dee won both rounds of her group's head-to-head challenge, reaching the top 40. She was also placed in the top 40 of the top model competition, and top 20 in Beauty With A Purpose. During the finals night, Dee was placed in the top 40, and eventually the top 12.

=== Miss Universe Philippines 2022 ===
On April 6, 2022, she was announced as an official candidate for the Miss Universe Philippines 2022 pageant. At the end of coronation night, she was crowned Miss Universe Philippines Tourism 2022, second to the eventual winner, Celeste Cortesi.

=== Miss Universe Philippines 2023 ===
On May 13, 2023, Dee won Miss Universe Philippines 2023. She also won Miss Aqua Boracay, Miss Pond's, Miss Zion Philippines, and the best in evening gown award. There were two question-and-answer rounds during the finals. In the first round, Dee was asked: “Income inequality is still high in the Philippines. The gap between the rich and the poor remains. How do we close the gap?” She responded:

I think first, we have to recognize what we have and the privileges that we have such as food, education, and homes. I think the best way to address this is through education because education holds no status quo. Every Filipino child has the right to an education, but not just any education, but quality education. Because I believe if the government can provide this to every Filipino child, we can not only elevate their quality of life, but we can empower them as well.

In the second and final question and answer round, she was asked: "The Department of Tourism has adopted a new branding campaign [sic]: 'We Give the World Our Best.' (Note: Erroneously attributed to the Department of Tourism. Campaign by the Office of the Presidential Adviser on Creative Communications (OPACC)) For you, what is the best that we could offer to the rest of the world? Why do you consider it so?" Dee answered:

The Philippines is home to very beautiful natural resources, from the beaches to the mountains, but I firmly believe that the best natural resource that the Philippines has is us Filipinos. We are the true heart and soul of the Philippines, with the way we are hospitable, with the warm smiles, and we are the reason the world keeps coming back for more. No matter where the universe takes me, I will always be proud to call the Philippines my home, and no matter what happens, I will always be proud to call myself Pinoy.

At the end of the competition, she was crowned by outgoing Miss Universe Philippines 2022 Celeste Cortesi as Miss Universe Philippines 2023. Dee represented the Philippines in the Miss Universe 2023 competition in El Salvador.

=== Miss Universe 2023 ===
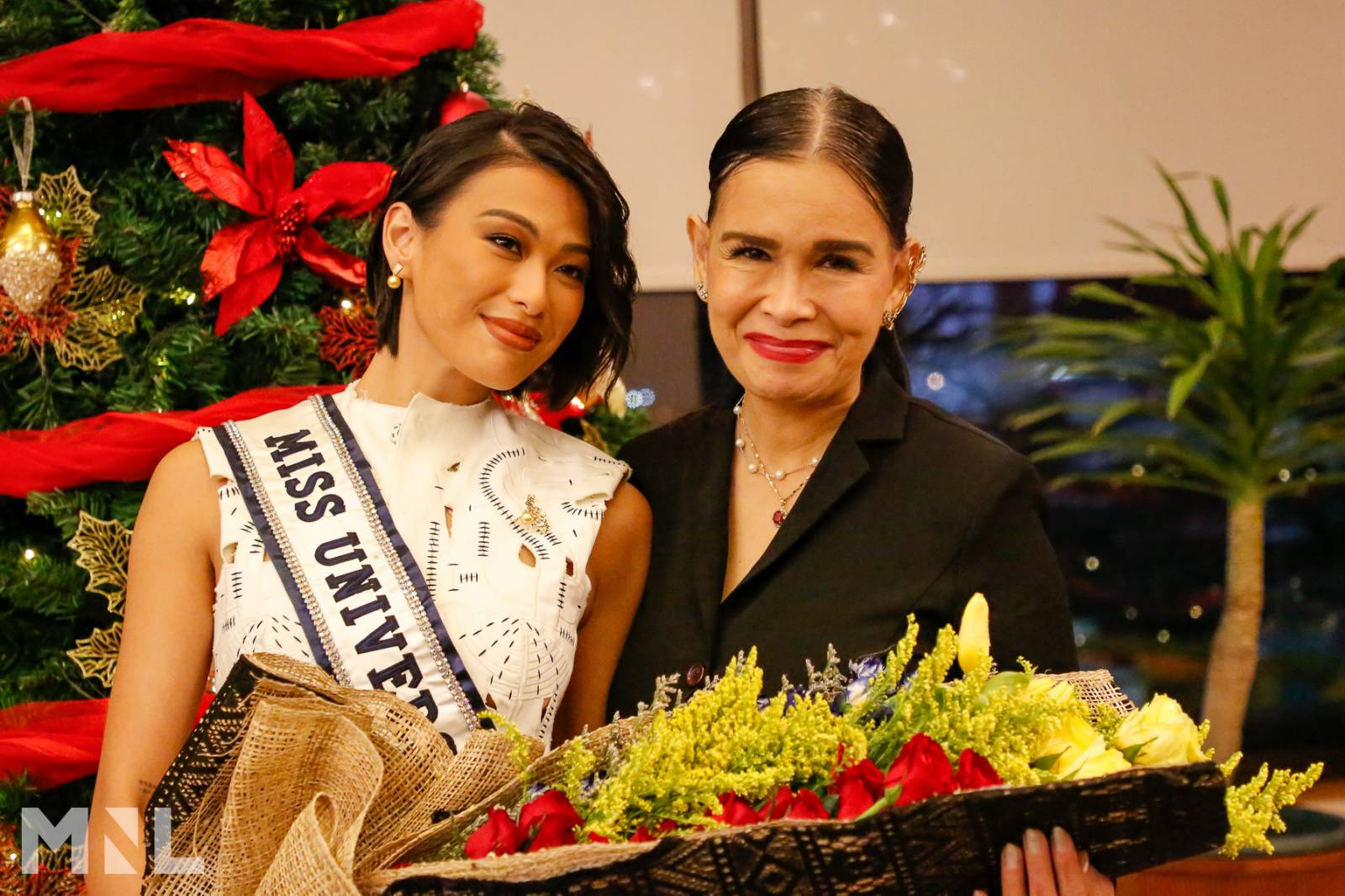
Dee with her mother, Melanie Marquez, in 2023

Dee represented the Philippines at Miss Universe 2023, held in El Salvador, where she finished as a top 10 finalist. She was also awarded four special awards: Spirit of Carnival Award, Best in National Costume, Fan Vote Winner, and Voice for Change Gold Winner, making her the most awarded candidate in the pageant’s history.

== Causes and philanthropy ==
Dee has been an advocate for autism awareness and mental health education since she was sixteen years old. She has been working with the Center for Possibilities Incorporation, a foundation that helps and cares for children with special needs, and other organizations in spreading more information on autism, assisting those who have the developmental disability, especially younger people, and creating more awareness about autism and mental health. After winning Miss World Philippines 2019, Dee donated part of her prize money to individuals on the autism spectrum who are in need of therapy.

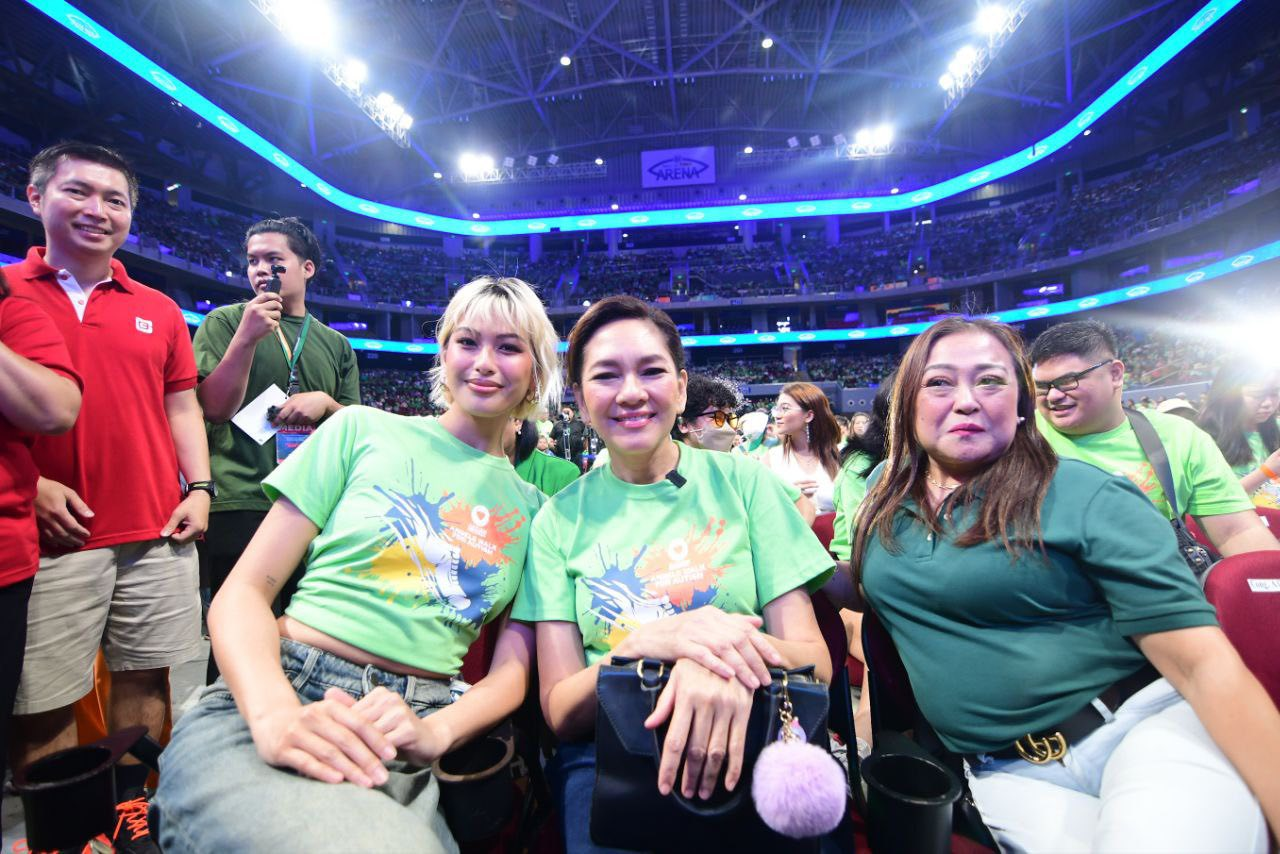
Dee (left) with Senator Risa Hontiveros (center) at the ASP Angels Walk for Autism 2025 event at the SM Mall of Asia Arena

Dee also works with the Autism Society Philippines (ASP) in bringing attention to the needs of individuals who are on the autism spectrum and their families, and improving access to intervention facilities and services, especially for those in the provincial areas. She supports autism advocacy programs on art, hippotherapy, and inclusive employment for those on the autism spectrum. She became the Goodwill Ambassador for the ASP in January 2020. With her father, Dee also campaigns for hepatitis awareness and for a hepatitis C-free society, under their own family initiative, HepCured. Dee is also an advocate for LGBT rights in the Philippines. On May 30, 2024, Dee, for the first time explained why she earlier remained closeted due to venomous bashing. “I myself didn't actually plan to come out,” she lamented in an Instagram reel. Dee is now the Philippines' second bisexual Miss Universe Philippines after Beatrice Gomez. As an LGBT pride advocate, Dee aptly posted a message for everyone in the upcoming Pride Month: “come as they are.”

== Modeling career ==
Dee began modeling with the Bench clothing brand in 2016. She signed with Click Model Management in New York, after being scouted during a Bench photoshoot.

In February 2024, Dee was named Chinabank's ambassador, becoming the company's first endorser in a century; notably, her family was the founder of the company despite no longer being its owner.

== Military ==
Dee is a reservist of Philippine Air Force with the rank of Sergeant. In 2023, she underwent and completed Basic Citizen Military Training under Philippine Air Force Reserve.

== Personal life ==
In May 2023, Dee came out as bisexual in an interview with Mega Magazine. She currently lives with actress and model Rhian Ramos.

On May 1, 2024, Dee got her arm tattooed by Whang-od with her three dots signature. Then, she playfully “crowned” Apo Whang Od, "beauty queen", while the latter signed Michelle’s tattoo-inspired Mark Bumgarner long black gown sketch inspired by her. Dee bestowed upon Whang-od a jersey with text “Filipinas 2023” in front, and “MMD” printed in the back.

== Filmography ==
=== Film ===
Year	Title	Role	Ref.
2019	Because I Love You	Gianna	
2019	Cara x Jagger	Mads	
2023	Keys to the Heart	Annette Marie Labayen	
2024	G! LU		

=== Television ===
Year	Title	Role	Ref.
2019	Love You Two	Michaela "Mochi" Isidro	
2019–2020	Glow Up	Herself / Main Host	
2019	One of the Baes	young Alona Aragoza	
2021–2022	Agimat ng Agila	Serpenta	
2021–2022	I Left My Heart in Sorsogon	Hazelyn "Hazel" Pangan	
2023	Mga Lihim ni Urduja	Freya Dayanghirang-Salazar	
2023	Eat Bulaga!	Herself / Guest co-host	
2023	TiktoClock	Herself / Guest	
2023	ASAP Natin 'To	Herself / Guest Performer	
2023	Forever Grateful: The ABS-CBN Christmas Special 2023	Herself / Guest Performer	
2023–24	Black Rider	Teresa Soriano	
2023–24	Kapuso Countdown to 2024: The GMA New Year Special	Herself / Performer / Host	
2024	All-Out Sundays	Herself / Guest Performer / Co-host	
2024	Family Feud	Herself / Contestant	
2024	It's Showtime	Herself / Guest co-host	
2024	Widows' War		
2024	Lolong	Special Participation	
2025	Pinoy Big Brother: Celebrity Collab Edition	Houseguest	
2025	Encantadia Chronicles: Sang'gre	Cassandra	

== Accolades ==
=== Awards and nominations ===
Year	Award	Category	Recipient(s)	Results	Source
2019	33rd PMPC Star Awards for Television	Best New Female TV Personality	Michelle Dee on Love You Two (GMA Network)	Nominated	
2019	33rd PMPC Star Awards for Television	Best Lifestyle Show Host	Michelle Dee with Winwyn Marquez and Thia Thomalla	Nominated	
2019	33rd PMPC Star Awards for Television	Best Lifestyle Show	Glow Up with Michelle Dee as host	Nominated	
2021	36th PMPC Star Awards for Movies	Best New Movie Actress	As Gianna in Because I Love You (2019)	Won	

== Notes ==
Awards and achievements
Preceded by (Ukraine) Viktoria Apanasenko	Miss Universe Best National Costume; 2023	Succeeded by (Philippines) Chelsea Manalo
Preceded by (Laos) Payengxa Lor	Miss Universe Fan Vote Winner; 2023	Succeeded by (Chile) Emilia Dides
Preceded by Celeste Cortesi (Pasay)	Miss Universe Philippines; 2023	Succeeded by Chelsea Manalo (Bulacan)
Preceded by Katrina Dimaranan (Taguig)	Miss Universe Philippines Tourism; 2022	Succeeded by Not awarded
Preceded by Katarina Rodriguez (Davao City)	Miss World Philippines; 2019	Succeeded by Tracy Perez (Cebu City)
