= Thia Thomalla =

Filipino-German actress, model and a pageant titleholder

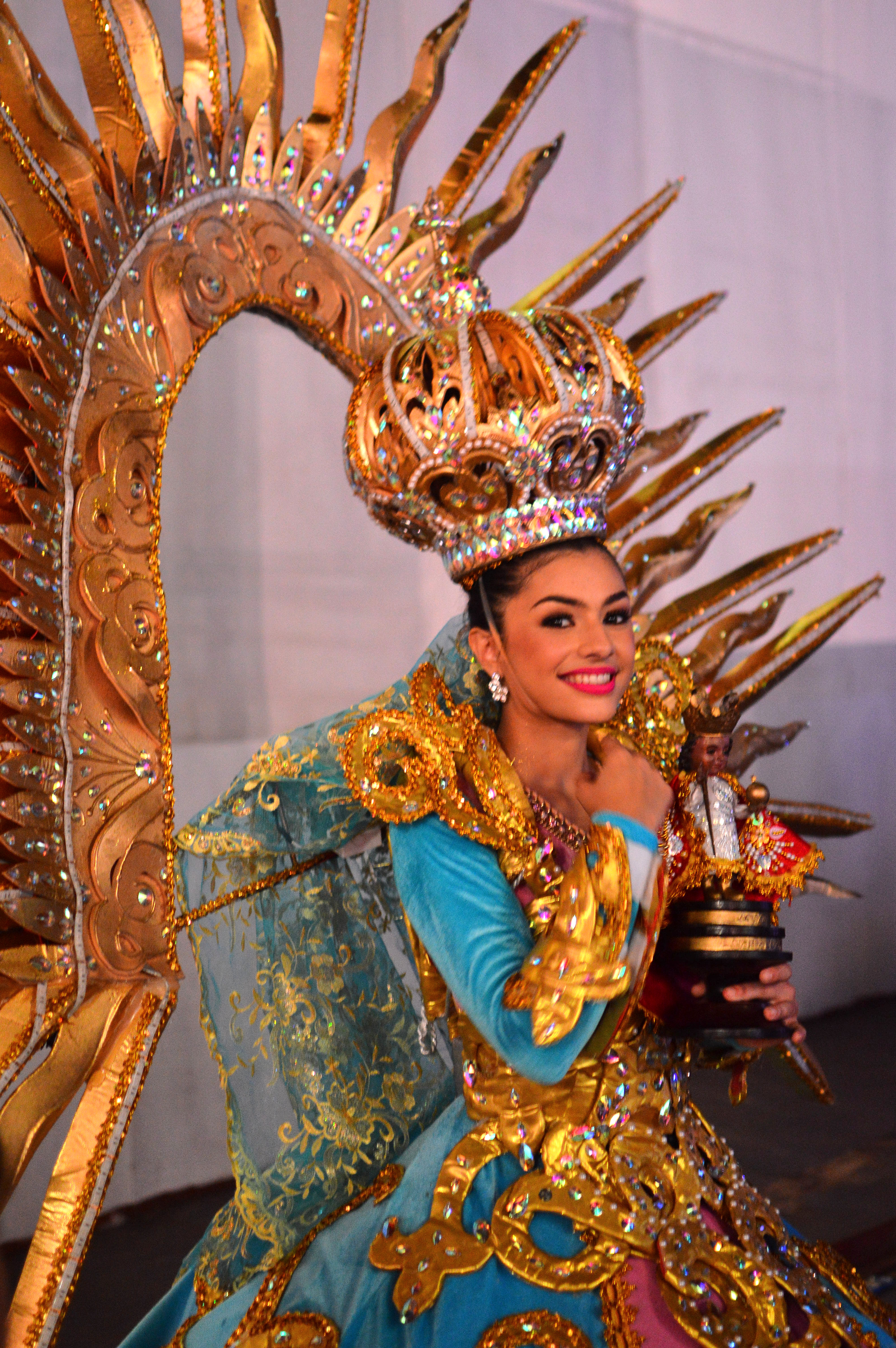
- Photo of Thia Thomalla
- Born: Cynthia Magpatoc Thomalla; February 25, 1995 (age 31); Macrohon, Southern Leyte, Philippines
- Other name: Thia Thomalla
- Education: STI Maasin
- Occupations: Actress; model
- Height: 5 ft 7 in (170 cm)
- Beauty pageant titleholder
- Title: Miss Eco Philippines 2017; Miss Eco International 2018
- Agency: Sparkle (2018–2024)
- Years active: 2018–present
- Major competitions: Miss World Philippines 2017; (Winner – Miss Eco Philippines); Miss Eco International 2018; (Winner)

Cynthia "Thia" Magpatoc Thomalla (born February 25, 1995) is a Filipino-German actress, model and a pageant titleholder.

== Career ==
Thia earned the title of Miss Eco International 2018 after representing the Philippines in a beauty contest held in Cairo, Egypt. She was the first Filipino to win Miss Eco International title. Previously, she was crowned Sinulog Festival Queen 2016.

After attending acting workshop in 2018, she signed as an artist in GMA Network as one of its talents.

== Filmography ==
=== Television ===
| Year | Title | Role | Ref. |
|---|---|---|---|
| 2024 | Magpakailanman: Hostage in Israel | Hagar Madnick | |
| 2023 | Love Before Sunrise | Margot | |
| 2023 | AraBella | Asher | |
| 2023 | Pepito Manaloto: Tuloy Ang Kwento | Chewy | |
| 2022–2023 | TiktoClock | Herself/Guest | |
| 2022–2025 | Family Feud Philippines | Herself/Guest Player | |
| 2022 | Magpakailanman: A Child's Trauma | Anna | |
| 2022 | Happy Together | Ms. Sanchez | |
| 2022 | First Lady | Valerie "Val" Cañete | |
| 2021 | First Yaya | Valerie "Val" Cañete | |
| 2020 | Tadhana: Inner Beauty | Melanie | |
| 2019–2020 | Glow Up Philippines | Herself/Host | |
| 2019 | Pepito Manaloto | Fashion show host | |
| 2019 | The Boobay and Tekla Show | Herself/Guest | |
| 2019 | Wagas: Ang Lihim ni Isadora | Herself/Guest | |
| 2019 | The Gift | Faith Salcedo | |

=== Film ===
| Year | Title | Role | Ref. |
|---|---|---|---|
| 2019 | Ang Henerasyong Sumuko Sa Love | Rachelle | |
| 2019 | Black Lipstick | | |
| 2019 | Because I Love You | Herself | |

Awards and achievements
| Preceded by (Canada) Amber Bernachi | Miss Eco International; 2018 | Succeeded by (Malaysia) Amy Nurthinie |
| Preceded by New Title | Miss Eco Philippines; 2017 | Succeeded by Maureen Montagne (Batangas) |
