= Miss Eco International 2019 =

5th Edition of Miss Eco International

- Date: 29 March 2019
- Hosts: James Deakin; Natalia Carvajal
- Entertainment: Ramy Gamal; Natalia Varrenko; Tracy Polarde Taipan; Sam Harvey R. Luyun Luiza Mar G. Cabuntagon David Gabriel Pitoc Zamantha Pimentel Zamantal Pimentel The Goth: Auxodia
- Venue: Al Masa Capital Hotel, Teiatro Masr, Cairo, Egypt
- Entrants: 54
- Placements: 21
- Debuts: Armenia; Aruba; Curacao; Denmark; El Salvador; Iceland; South Korea; Mozambique
- Withdrawals: Bulgaria; Ghana; Haiti; Chile; Colombia; Italy; Lebanon; Nigeria; Pakistan; Panama; Dominican Republic; South Sudan; Suriname; Tuvalu; Uruguay; Vietnam; Zambia
- Returns: Albania; Argentina; Finland; Kyrgyzstan; Paraguay; Puerto Rico; Singapore; Ukraine; Greece; Zimbabwe
- Winner: Suheyn Cipriani, Peru (Dethroned); Amy Nur Tinie, Malaysia (Assumed)
- Best National Costume: Jocelyn Mieles Zambrano (Ecuador)
- Miss Eco Video: Ratu Vashti Annisa (Indonesia)

Miss Eco International 2019 was the fifth edition of Miss Eco International pageant, held on March 29, 2019 at Al Masa Capital Hotel, Teiatro Masr, Cairo, Egypt.

At the end of the event, Cynthia Magpatoc Thomalla from the Philippines crowned her successor Suheyn Cipriani from Peru as Miss Eco International 2019. Later on, Suheyn Cipriani Noriega was dethroned due to pregnancy. The title was then given to the fourth runner-up, Amy Nur Tinie Abdul Aziz from Malaysia after the runners-up refused to claim the title.

== Results ==
=== Placements ===
Placement	Contestant
Miss Eco International 2019	Peru – Suheyn Cipriani (Note: Dethroned due to her pregnancy during her reign.) (Dethroned)
1st Runner-up	Philippines – Maureen Montagne (Note: Declined the offer as the title holder due to her commitments with Binibining Pilipinas.)
2nd Runner-up	United States – Jordan Elizabeth
3rd Runner-up	Ukraine – Diana Voliakova
4th Runner-up	Malaysia – Amy Nur Tinie (Note: Assumed winner after the dethronement of the titleholder) (Note: Originally as Miss Eco International Fourth runner-up)(Assumed)
Top 10	Ecuador – Jocelyn Mieles; France – Chloé Jovenin; Indonesia – Ratu Vashti Annisa §; Japan – Nanami Tomita; Paraguay – Irene Camacho
Top 21	Argentina – Lucy Barreto; Canada – Sasha Lombardi; China – Ying Fu; Curaçao – Mariana Pietersz; Mauritius – Amber Korimdun; Mozambique – Keilla Cesária D'Leonardo; Nepal – Muna Gauchan; Poland – Agata Chrośniak; Thailand – Cat Arthitiya; Tunisia – Haifa Ghedir; Venezuela – Yara D' León

§ — Automatically enters top 21 from winning the Miss Eco Video

=== Continental Queens ===
Continental Titles	Contestant
Miss Eco Africa	Egypt – Farah Shabaan
Miss Eco America	Puerto Rico – Ciara Marie Rosendo Martínez
Miss Eco Latin America	Brazil – Tainá Laydner Fiore
Miss Eco Asia	South Korea – Jo Ju-hyeon
Miss Eco Europe	Denmark – Raimonda Gečaitė

=== Special awards ===
Awards	Winners
Best National Costume	Ecuador – Jocelyn Mieles Zambrano
Miss Eco Video	Indonesia – Ratu Vashti Annisa
Best Eco Dress	Malaysia – Amy Nur Tinie
Miss Elegance	Egypt – Farah Shabaan
Best Eco Talent	(gold) (Russia) Bashkortostan – Kristina Toimachenova; (silver) France – Chloé Jovenin; (bronze) China – Ying Fu
Miss Eco Fitness	(gold) Zimbabwe – Alice Siyakangelana; (silver) Paraguay — Irene Camacho Azcona; (bronze) Denmark – Raimonda Gečaitė
Best Resort Wear	(gold) France – Chloe Jovenin; (silver) Paraguay — Irene Camacho Azcona; (bronze) Philippines – Maureen Montagne

== Candidates ==
54 confirmed contestants to compete the title.

Country/Territory	Candidates	Age (Note: Ages during the competition)
Albania	Alba Bajrami	19
Argentina	Lucy Barreto	–
Armenia	Marta Baghdasaryan	24
Aruba	Carolyn Collinda	26
Belarus	Karolina Granat	21
Bolivia	Nimeyra Flores Hurtado	22
Brazil	Tainá Laydner Fiore	22
Canada	Sasha Lombardi	26
China	Ying Fu	–
Costa Rica	Melania González	27
Curaçao	Mariana Pietersz	24
Denmark	Raimonda Gecaite	–
Ecuador	Jocelyn Mieles Zambrano	24
Egypt	Farah Shabaan	20
El Salvador	Katia Lobos Iraheta	28
Fernando de Noronha	Karine Martovicz	24
Finland	Marika Eerola	21
France	Chloé Jovenin	18
Germany	Dana Wiebke Schäfer	25
Greece	Maria Psilou	21
Iceland	Elísa Gróa Steinþórsdóttir	20
India	Simran Kaur Saunta	18
Indonesia	Ratu Vashti Annisa	23
Japan	Nanami Tomita	28
Kyrgyzstan	Azalia Duishen	–
Malaysia	Amy Nur Tinie Abdul Aziz	23
Mauritius	Amber Korimdun	23
Mexico	Melissa De Anda	23
Montenegro	Ana Miljanić	18
Mozambique	Keilla Cesária D'Leonardo Nhantumbo	–
Myanmar	Thyne Thu Thu Thwe	–
Nepal	Muna Gauchan	21
Netherlands	Maritte van Houten	21
Panama	Jennifer Guerra	24
Paraguay	Irene Camacho Azcona	23
Peru	Suheyn Cipriani	22
Philippines	Maureen Montagne	25
Poland	Agata Chrośniak	24
Portugal	Ana Machado	21
Puerto Rico	Ciara Rosendo	20
Bashkortostan	Kristina Tolmacheva	20
Russia	Daria Sergeevna	–
Serbia	Andrijana Savic	18
Singapore	Anna Yang	22
Slovakia	Ivana Stotková	22
Slovenia	Melisa Hrapić Cvetko	23
South Africa	Bianca Rautenbach	20
South Korea	Jo Ju-hyeon	18
Spain	Carolay Fumero Deniz	22
Thailand	Cat Arthitiya	23
Tunisia	Haifa Ghedir	25
Ukraine	Diana Voliakova	–
United States	Jordan Elizabeth	25
Venezuela	Yara D' León	18
Zimbabwe	Alice Siyakangelana	–
