= Miss World Philippines 2017 =

7th Miss World Philippines pageant

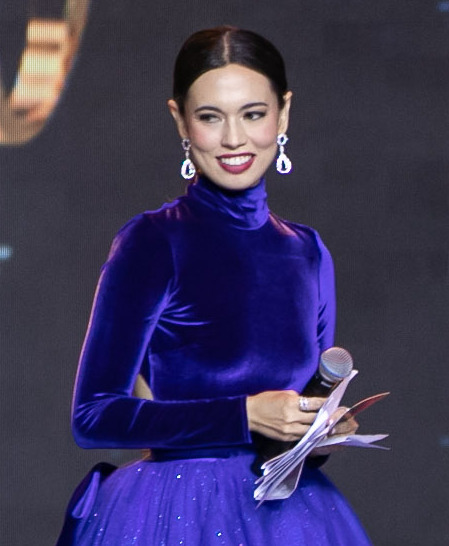
- Laura Lehmann
- Date: September 3, 2017
- Presenters: KC Montero; Carla Abellana; Iya Villania
- Entertainment: Teejay Marquez; Jay R; Kris Lawrence
- Venue: Mall of Asia Arena, Pasay, Metro Manila, Philippines
- Broadcaster: GMA Network
- Entrants: 35
- Placements: 15
- Winner: Laura Lehmann; Makati
- Photogenic: Cynthia Thomalla, Cebu City

Miss World Philippines 2017 was the seventh Miss World Philippines pageant, held at the Mall of Asia Arena in Pasay, Metro Manila, Philippines, on September 3, 2017. It was the first edition under the new national director, Arnold Vegafria.

Catriona Gray crowned Laura Lehmann as her successor at the end of the event. Three additional titleholders were also crowned at the event which were Winwyn Marquez as Reina Hispanoamericana Filipinas 2017, Cynthia Thomalla as Miss Eco Philippines 2017, and Sophia Senoron as Miss Multinational Philippines 2017. Glyssa Perez was named first runner-up, and Zara Carbonell was named second runner-up.

The event was attended by Miss World chairman Julia Morley, Miss World 2016 Stephanie Del Valle, and the Miss World 2016 Continental Queens of Beauty.

== Results ==
=== Placements ===
Color keys

- The contestant won in an international pageant.
- The contestant was a semi-finalist in an international pageant.

Placement	Contestant	International Placement
Miss World Philippines 2017	#15 – Laura Lehmann	Top 40 – Miss World 2017
Miss Eco Philippines 2017	#32 – Cynthia Thomalla	Winner – Miss Eco International 2018
Reina Hispanoamericana Filipinas 2017	#9 – Winwyn Marquez	Winner – Reina Hispanoamericana 2017
Miss Multinational Philippines 2017	#35 – Sophia Senoron	Winner – Miss Multinational 2017
1st Princess	#3 – Glyssa Leiann Perez	
2nd Princess	#24 – Zara Carbonell	
Top 10	#6 – Jona Sweett; #14 – Cristina Marie Coloma; #26 – Janela Joy Cuaton; #28 – Sheila Marie Reyes	
Top 15	#11 – Gabriela Ortega; #12 – Henna Kaizelle Cajandig; #22 – Chelsea Manalo; #27 – Ella Eiveren Lubag; #33 – Noelle Uy-Tuazon	

=== Special awards ===
Award	Contestant	Ref.
Miss Photogenic	#32 – Cynthia Thomalla	
Best in Long Gown	#32 – Cynthia Thomalla	
Miss BlueWater Day Spa	#32 – Cynthia Thomalla	
Miss Best Skin	#26 – Janela Joy Cuaton	
Miss Cosmo Skin	#15 – Laura Lehmann	
Miss Savoy Hotel Boracay	#9 – Winwyn Marquez	
Zalora People's Choice	#13 – Kathryn Cudiamat	
Miss BYS Philippines	#15 – Laura Lehmann	
Miss Fila	#3 – Glyssa Perez	
Miss Bench Body	#9 – Winwyn Marquez	

== Events ==
=== Fast Track Events ===
Event	Winner	Finalists
Talent Competition	#9 – Winwyn Marquez	#1 – Shawntel Cruz; #5 – Kaycie Lyn Fajardo; #27 – Ella Eiverin Lubag; #28 – Sheila Marie Reyes; #31 – Jeanyfer Ozbot
Sports Competition	#3 – Glyssa Perez	#1 – Shawntel Cruz; #2 – Veronica Villones; #8 – Nikki Deveza; #16 – Ethel Abellanosa; #19 – Joanna Marie Rabe; #32 – Cynthia Thomalla
Beach Beauty	#9 – Winwyn Marquez	#6 – Jona Sweett; #24 – Zara Carbonell; #26 – Janela Joy Cuaton; #28 – Sheila Marie Reyes; #31 – Jeanyfer Ozbot; #32 – Cynthia Thomalla
Top Model	#32 – Cynthia Thomalla	#6 – Jona Sweett; #9 – Winwyn Marquez; #15 – Laura Lehmann; #22 – Chelsea Anne Manalo; #26 – Janela Joy Cuaton; #27 – Ella Eiveren Lubag
Multimedia	#15 – Laura Lehmann	#4 – Rose Flores; #9 – Winwyn Marquez; #10 – Leidda Babasanta; #20 – Trizha Ocampo; #26 – Janela Joy Cuaton; #35 – Sophia Señoron

== Judges ==
included:

- Diether Ocampo - Actor
- Willie Revillame - TV host
- Ruffa Gutierrez - Miss World 1993, second princess
- Vicky Morales - Broadcaster, TV Host
- Stephanie Del Valle - Miss World 2016
- David Licauco - Mister Chinatown Philippines 2014, first runner-up
- Paolo Roldan - International model
- Roselle Monteverde - Film producer
- Ann Li - Blogger

== Contestants ==
35 contestants competed for the four titles.

No.	Contestant	Age	Hometown
1	Shawntel Michole Cruz	20	Benguet
2	Veronica Villones	20	Bulacan
3	Glyssa Leiann Perez	22	Bohol
4	Rose Flores	24	Bel-Air, Makati
5	Kaycie Lyn Fajardo	23	Manila
6	Jona Sweett	22	Aklan
7	Jane Darren Genobisa	20	Bansalan, Davao del Sur
8	Faye Dominique Deveza	21	Lucban, Quezon
9	Teresita Ssen Marquez	25	Parañaque
10	Leidda Babasanta	22	Santa Rosa, Laguna
11	Gabriela Ortega	26	Albay
12	Henna Kaizelle Cajandig	25	Tacurong
13	Kathryn Jade Cudiamat	25	Rizal
14	Cristina Marie Coloma	26	Northern Samar
15	Laura Victoria Lehmann	23	Makati
16	Ethel Abellanosa	21	Tuburan, Cebu
17	Jellie Alliana Escondon	22	Pandacan, Manila
18	Angel Christine Alvaira	25	San Nicolas, Batangas
19	Joanna Marie Rabe	22	Zambales
20	Trizha Ocampo	23	La Union
21	Netania Deveza	18	Quezon
22	Chelsea Anne Manalo	17	Meycauayan, Bulacan
23	Princess Laureano	18	Aurora
24	Zara Carbonell	23	Lemery
25	Karren Dela	21	Muntinlupa
26	Janela Joy Cuaton	20	Masbate
27	Ella Eiveren Lubag	20	Laguna
28	Sheila Marie Reyes	22	Valenzuela
29	Krystle Ongjangco	24	Quezon City
30	Kathleen Gomez	23	Balete, Batangas
31	Jeanyfer Ozbot	22	Iloilo City
32	Cynthia Thomalla	22	Cebu City
33	Noelle Uy-Tuazon	25	Davao City
34	Andrea Poliquit	23	Malabon
35	Sophia Señoron	17	Manila

== Notes ==
=== Post-pageant notes ===
- Laura Lehmann competed at Miss World 2017 in Sanya, China and finished as a Top 40 quarter-finalist. Lehmann is also among the five winners of Beauty with a Purpose, part of the Top 10 for the People's Choice award, and one of the winners of the Head to Head Challenge.
- Teresita Ssen Marquez competed at Reina Hispanoamericana 2017 in Santa Cruz, Bolivia where she emerged as the winner. Marquez was the first Asian to be crowned Reina Hispanoamericana. Cynthia Thomalla and Sophia Señoron also emerged as the winners of Miss Eco International 2018 and Miss Multinational 2017, respectively.
- Glyssa Perez competed again at Miss World Philippines in 2019 where she was crowned as the first Miss Philippines Tourism.
