= World Food Day =

International day of food security

- World Food Day 2009
- Observed by: All UN Member States
- Date: 16 October
- Next time: 16 October 2027

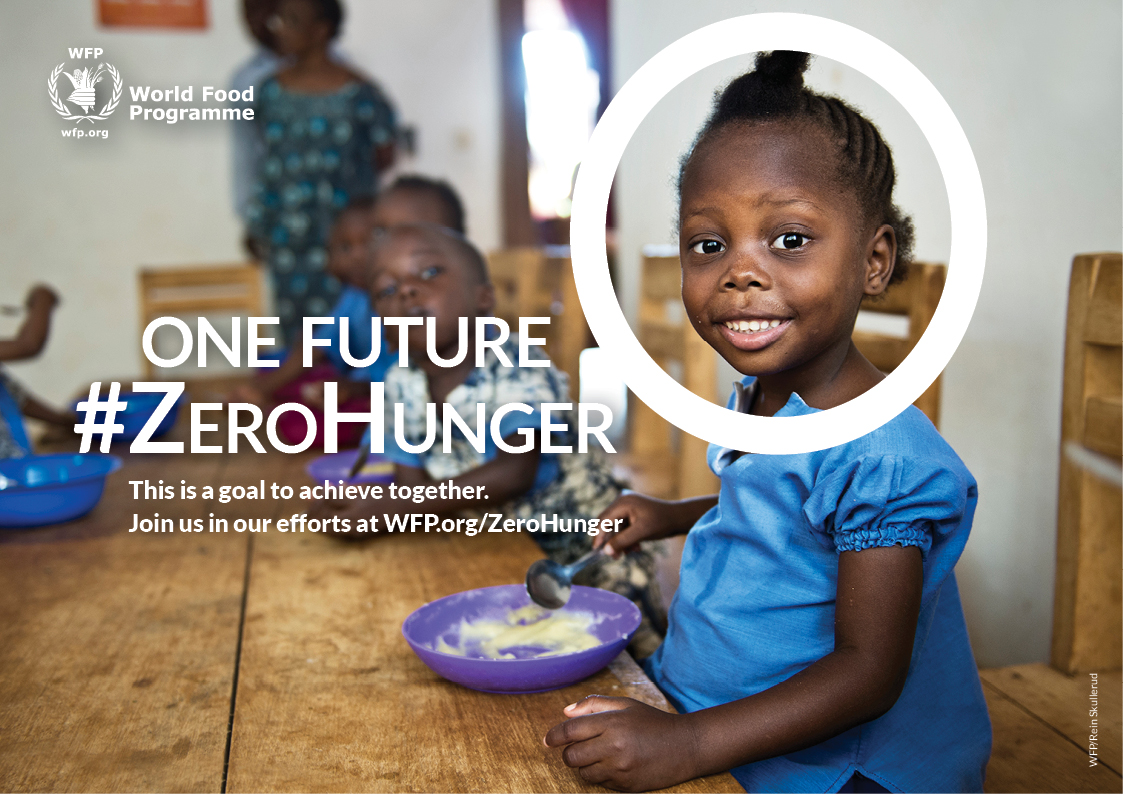
An image produced as part of the World Food Programme's social media campaign for World Food Day in 2015.

World Food Day is an international day celebrated every year worldwide on October 16 to commemorate the date of the founding of the United Nations Food and Agriculture Organization in 1945. The day is celebrated widely by many other organizations concerned with hunger and food security, including the World Food Programme, the World Health Organization and the International Fund for Agricultural Development. WFP received the Nobel Prize in Peace for 2020 for their efforts to combat hunger, contribute to peace in conflict areas, and for playing a leading role in stopping the use of hunger in the form of a weapon for war and conflict.

Each year, a new theme is selected. Themes tend to focus on a common issue that connects to hunger and food security. Previous themes have been on protecting and improving agriculture, climate change, poverty, food, water and health shortages.

The theme for 2026 is "Innovate today. Nourish tomorrow." This is encouraging the use of technology and science to create advancements to feed future generations.

== Origins ==
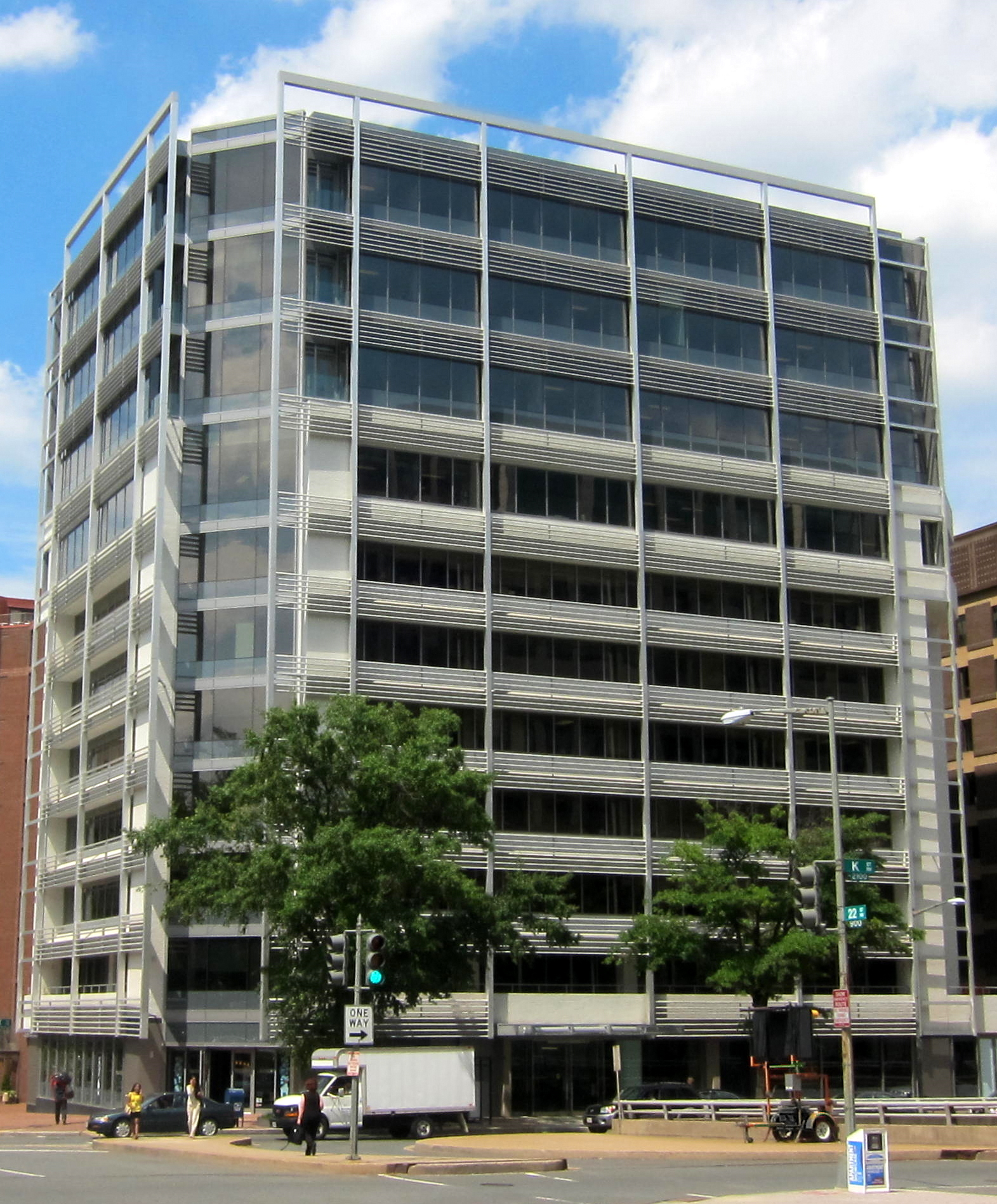
U.S. National Committee for World Food Day offices in Washington, D.C.

World Food Day (WFD) was established by FAO's Member Countries at the Organization's 20th General Conference in November 1979.

The Hungarian Delegation, led by the former Hungarian Minister of Agriculture and Food Dr. Pál Romány, played an active role at the 20th Session of the FAO Conference and suggested the idea of celebrating the WFD worldwide. It has since been observed every year in more than 150 countries, raising awareness of the issues behind poverty and hunger.

== Themes ==
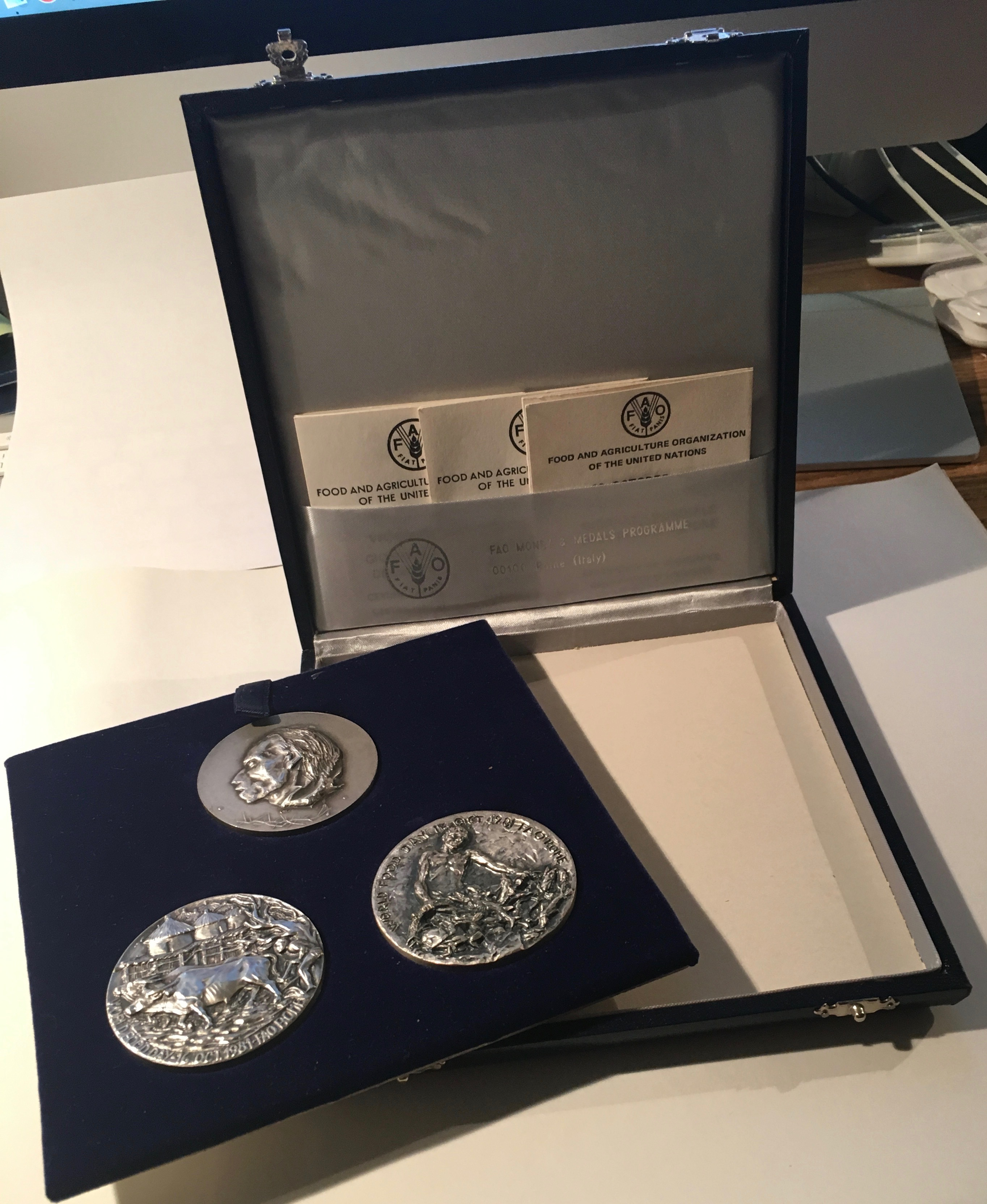
FAO World Food Day 1981 3pc Set Silver

Since 1981, World Food Day has adopted a different theme each year in order to highlight areas needed for action and provide a common focus. FAO issued World Food Day medals each year to commemorate and promote the anniversary.

Most of the themes revolve around agriculture because only investment in agriculture – together with support for education and health – will turn this situation around. The bulk of that investment will have to come from the private sector, with public investment playing a crucial role, especially in view of its facilitating and stimulating effect on private investment.

In spite of the importance of agriculture as the driving force in the economies of many developing countries, this vital sector is frequently starved of investment. In particular, foreign aid to agriculture has shown marked declines over the past 20 years.

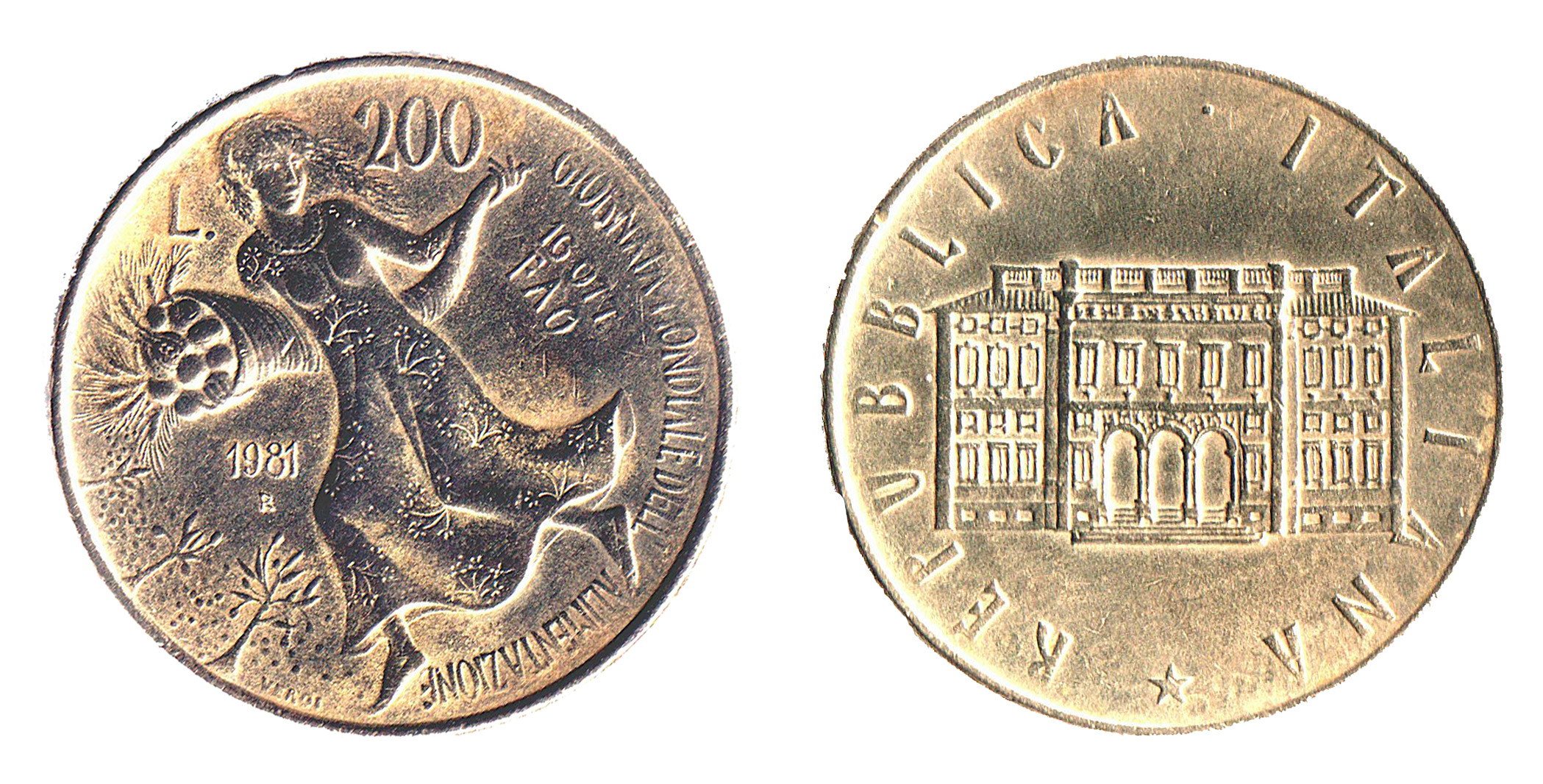
Italian coin dedicated to the first World Food Day (1981)

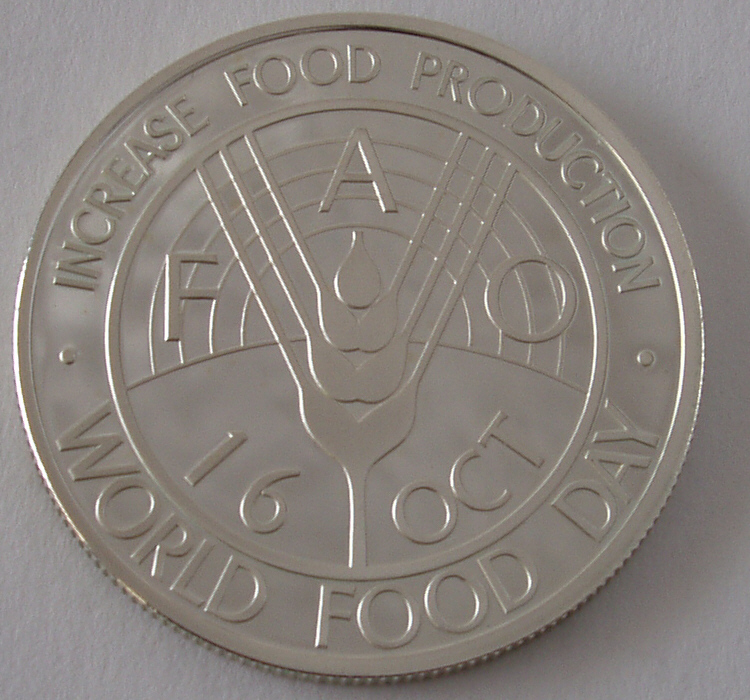
Afghan coin dedicated to the first World Food Day (1981)

- 1981: Food comes first
- 1982: Food comes first
- 1983: Food security
- 1984: Women in agriculture
- 1985: Rural poverty
- 1986: Fishermen and fishing communities
- 1987: Small farmers
- 1988: Rural youth
- 1989: Food and the environment
- 1990: Food for the future
- 1991: Trees for life
- 1992: Food and nutrition
- 1993: Harvesting nature's diversity
- 1994: Water for life
- 1995: Food for all
- 1996: Fighting hunger and malnutrition
- 1997: Investing in food security
- 1998: Women feed the world
- 1999: Youth against hunger
- 2000: A millennium free from hunger
- 2001: Fight hunger to reduce poverty
- 2002: Water: source of food security
- 2003: Working together for an international alliance against hunger
- 2004: Biodiversity for food security
- 2005: Agriculture and intercultural dialogue
- 2006: Investing in agriculture for food security
- 2007: The right to food
- 2008: World food security: the challenges of climate change and bioenergy
- 2009: Achieving food security in times of crisis
- 2010: United against hunger
- 2011: Food prices - from crisis to stability
- 2012: Agricultural cooperatives – key to feeding the world
- 2013: Sustainable Food Systems for Food Security and Nutrition
- 2014: Family Farming: "Feeding the world, caring for the earth"
- 2015: "Social Protection and Agriculture: Breaking the Cycle of Rural Poverty"
- 2016: Climate change: "Climate is changing. Food and agriculture must too"
- 2017: Change the future of migration. Invest in food security and rural development.
- 2018: "Our Actions Are Our Future, Ending World Hunger by 2030 is Possible"
- 2019: "Our Actions Are Our Future, Healthy Diets for A # ZeroHunger World"
- 2020: "Grow, Nourish, Sustain. Together"
- 2021: "Safe food now for a healthy tomorrow".
- 2022: "Leave NO ONE behind".
- 2023: "Water is life, water is food. Leave no one behind"
- 2024: Rights to foods for a betterlife and better future"
- 2025: "Hand in Hand for Better Foods and Better Future"
- 2026: "Innovate Today. Nourish Tomorrow."

== Events ==
In over 150 countries, World Food Day is marked by a number of events. Collective action helps make World Food Day one of the most celebrated days in the United Nations' calendar. Hundreds of events and outreach activities bring together governments, businesses, organizations, the media, the public, and even the youth. They help promote worldwide awareness of hunger and take action for the future of food, people, and the planet. Examples of some events held across the world are listed below.

=== United States ===
World Food Day has been a tradition in the United States since one year after the first World Food Day in 1981. In the United States the endeavor is sponsored by 450 national, private voluntary organizations. One example for World Food Day events is the World Food Day Sunday Dinners that Oxfam America sponsors in collaboration with several other non-profits. Emeritus Archbishop Desmond Tutu and author Francis Moore Lappe have teamed up with Oxfam America to promote World Food Day Sunday Dinners. The Iowa Hunger Summit has been held on or near World Food Day since 2007, and is organized by the World Food Prize in conjunction with their annual symposium in Des Moines, Iowa.

=== Europe ===
In Italy, ministries, universities, research agencies, international agencies, and NGOs have organized many conferences as well as exhibitions and symposia. The headquarters of the Food and Agriculture Organization (FAO) is located in Rome, Italy.

In Germany, the Federal Ministry of Consumer Protection, Food and Agriculture have all become involved via press conferences.

Spanish television has been active in broadcasting events. FAO Goodwill Ambassador – Spanish soccer star Raul – has taken part in events and helped highlight food-security issues across his country.

The UK Food Group has also been active through conferences and media broadcasts.

In the emerging economies of Eastern Europe – i.e. Albania, Armenia, Croatia, Czech Republic, Georgia, Hungary, Moldova, North Macedonia, Serbia and Montenegro, and Slovak Republic – a variety of activities have been held.

In Hungary, experts have given presentations in the Hungarian Agricultural Museum and FAO, and WFD medals have been awarded to Hungarian experts by the FAO Sub-Regional Representative.

On behalf of the Holy See, Popes John Paul II and Benedict XVI have sent an annual message for food producers and consumers on World Food Day.

=== Africa ===
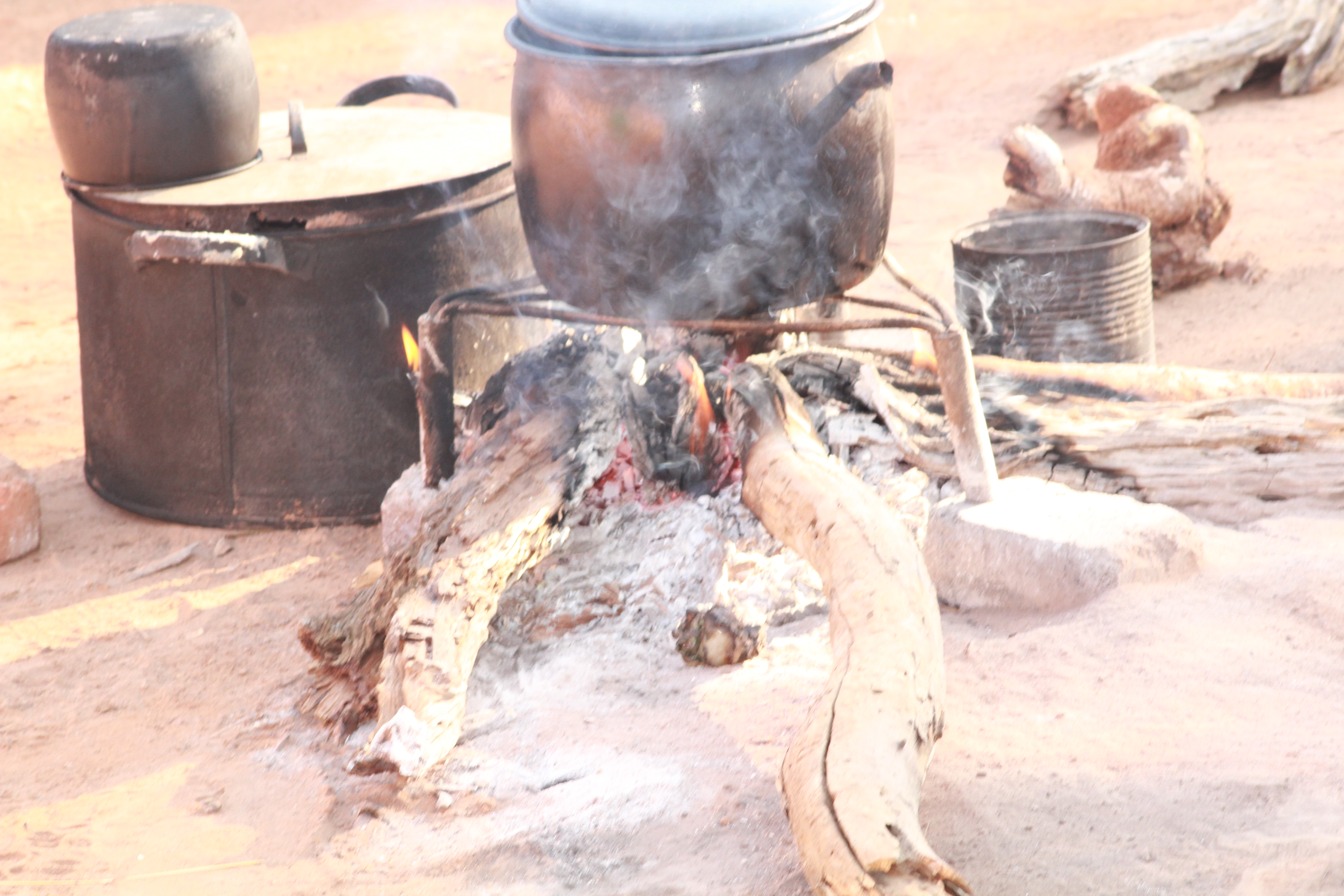
World Food Day celebration at Kalakamati, Botswana

Angola celebrated WFD in 2005 through the 4th Forum on Rural Women, while in Burundi the second vice-president planted potatoes to provide a symbolic example about food production.

In Central African Republic, the President of the Republic has inaugurated a bridge at Boda to coincide with World Food Day, making the agricultural production area more accessible.

In Chad, thousands of people have attended debates, conferences and activities including theatre, films, folk dance, visits to project sites and visits by agricultural companies.

In Ghana, the Ministry of Food and Agriculture has hosted a food security conference, while Namibia has run an awareness campaign through national media.

In Botswana, the National Food technology research center recently exhibited its products and services at the World Food Day commemoration held at Kalakamati Farm on 19 October 2017.

Egypt has hosted a Forum on nutrition issues. Morocco and Tunisia have held seminars and exhibitions.

In Nigeria, organizations and individuals involved in feeding programs (e.g. Foodbank Nigeria) connect with other stakeholders in food production, agro-allied industries, wholesalers and community-based organizations to address food security challenges. For example, since 2009, Northern Nigeria is unstable. According to the humanitarian organisation Action Against Hunger (AAH), the ongoing and deepening humanitarian crisis in Northeast Nigeria has led to the displacement of over 1.5 million people, causing four million people to experience acute food insecurity and be in need of humanitarian assistance (Action Against Hunger). Since 2010, the AAH have been working with both "national agencies" and "local communities" to build capacity to treat deadly malnutrition caused by food insecurity (Action Against Hunger).

=== Asia ===
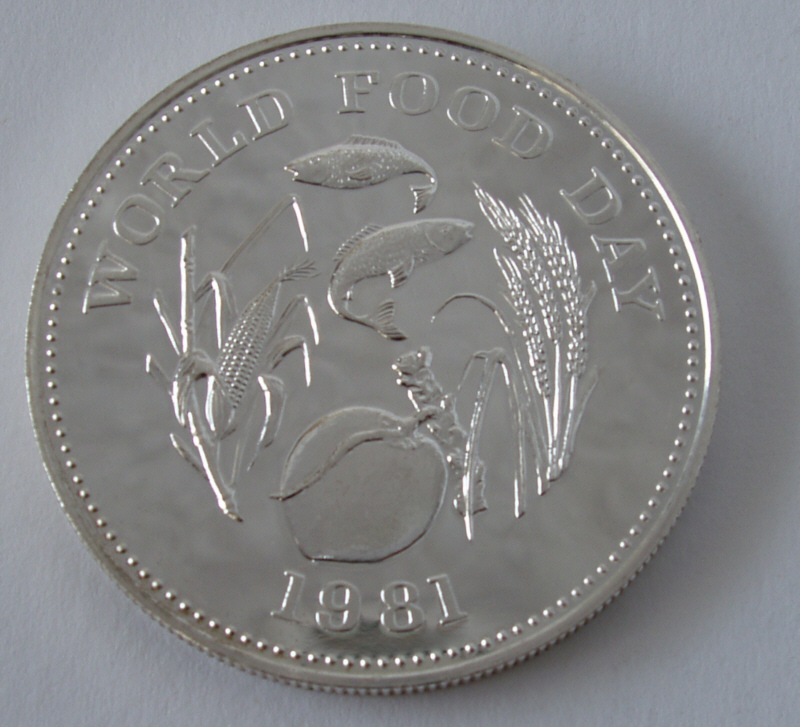
25 Philippine peso coin with World Food Day

In Asia, World Food Day is marked by celebration, educating, and participating. Celebrations often focus on a mix of large-scale trade exhibitions, policy-making, and school-level awareness programs to educate the younger generations.

The Government of Bangladesh stays involved through organizing a rally outside the national parliament, followed by a seminar and the opening of a three-day food fair.

China typically marks the day with a national "Food Security Awareness Week." Online and offline activities highlighted China's concrete actions and partnerships in advancing sustainable and resilient agrifood systems. Activities focus on grain conservation, reducing food waste in schools, and highlighting agricultural innovations in rural provinces. In 2005, celebrations were organized in Qujing City, where numerous ethnic minorities live, by the Ministry of Agriculture and the Government of Qujing City, with the participation of a number of senior officials of the Government.

In the Democratic People's Republic of Korea, seminars have been held and visits made to various project sites.

In India, World Food Day is celebrated in honour of the date of the founding of the FAO of the United Nations in 1945. It is also followed in India.

The Ministry of Agriculture of Indonesia has in the past organized a major Food Expo in Bandung, West Java, while a Farmers' and Fishermen's Workshop of NGOs was held in Bali.

In Armenia, staff from the Ministry of Agriculture, non-governmental organizations, Armenian State Agriculture University, the donor community, international organizations, and the mass media have participated in the World Food Day ceremony.

In Afghanistan, representatives of Ministries, embassies, UN agencies, International Financial Organizations, National and International NGOs, and FAO staff have attended the World Food Day ceremony.

In Cyprus, special ceremonies have been organized in primary and secondary schools, where teachers explained the significance of World Food Day.

In Pakistan, a Society Named as MAPS (Mentor Amiable Professional Society) celebrates world food day by providing food packages to poor & née-dies and tells the importance of food to the people by organizing workshops.

In the Philippines on 16 October 2015, writer and real estate entrepreneur Wilson Lee Flores started celebrating "World Pandesal Day" at the non-partisan Pandesal Forum of his Kamuning Bakery Cafe in Quezon City. He and celebrities like GMA Network, Inc. Chairman Felipe Gozon, Senator Sonny Angara and actor Dingdong Dantes gave away 30,000 "pugon" or wood-fired brick oven breads and other gifts to urban poor families. In 2016, he repeated this civic project with celebrities like Quezon City Vice-Mayor Joy Belmonte and business leader James Dy of the Philippine Chinese Charitable Association, plus undertaking free medical, dental and optical missions for urban poor families. In 2017, the celebration included 50,000 breads, sardines, hams, noodles, and juices from various companies, plus two dates for free medical, dental and optical clinics on 8 October and 29 October. Special guests at this third "World Pandesal Day" were led by Supreme Court Chief Justice Maria Lourdes Sereno, Vice-president Leni Robredo and Philippine National Police (PNP) chief General Ronald Dela Rosa accompanied by Quezon City senior superintendent Guillermo Eleazar.

In Mongolia, for the World Food Day celebration in the country, it has become a tradition that the research conference "Food security" is annually organized by Ministry of Food, Agriculture and Light Industry and UN FAO representative office in Mongolia in cooperation with the Mongolian Food Industry Association. This event provides an opportunity to promote research work, to highlight the contributions of scholars and researchers to the country's food security, to strengthen the cooperation and collaboration between research institutions, NGOs and food related public organization, to transfer the technological research in the industry, and to develop research-based policy and regulations.

=== Latin America ===
In Brazil, World Food Day is celebrated through initiatives that focus on decreas hunger and providing healthier foods for Brazilians. During the 2024 World Food Day ceremony, the government of Brazil announced two new plans, the National Food Supply Plan "Alimento no Prato" (Food on the plate – Planaab) and the National Plan for Agroecology and Organic Production (Planapo).

In Chile, exhibitions of indigenous food products have been prepared by the local communities.

In Argentina, senior officials of the Government, academics, international organizations and the press have participated in the main ceremony.

In Mexico in 2005, a National Campaign for a "Mexico Without Hunger" was held, with the involvement and support of civil society and students.

In Cuba, producers have been able to exchange views and experiences at an agricultural fair. The media strongly supports awareness campaigns on World Food Day.

In Peru, during 2017, the Agriculture and Irrigation Ministry (Minagri) started a campaign to promote consumption of native, high-protein foods such as quinoa, kiwicha, and legumes, among others.

In Venezuela, there has been national coverage of events.

== See also ==
- Food and Agriculture Organization
- Food price crisis
- Food security
- World Food Prize
- World Food Programme
- World Hunger
- List of food days
