= Koreen Medina =

Filipino beauty pageant titleholder

- Born: Andrea Koreen Garcia Medina; March 27, 1995 (age 31); Santa Rosa City, Laguna, Philippines
- Occupations: Actress; singer; dancer; model
- Height: 1.70 m (5 ft 7 in)
- Beauty pageant titleholder
- Title: Mutya ng Pilipinas Asia Pacific International (Intercontinental)
- Agency: Star Magic (2011–2013; 2024–present); GMA Artist Center (2015–2017)
- Years active: 2010–2017; 2024–present
- Hair color: Brown
- Eye color: Brown
- Major competitions: Mutya ng Pilipinas 2013 (Winner); Miss Intercontinental 2013 (3rd Runner-up & Miss Intercontinental 2013 Asia and Oceania)
- Known for: Lorraine of Juan Happy Love Story

Andrea Koreen Garcia Medina (born March 27, 1995) also known as Koreen Medina is a Filipino beauty pageant titleholder who was crowned Mutya ng Pilipinas Asia Pacific Int'l for Miss Intercontinental 2013. She competed at the Miss Intercontinental 2013 pageant in Magdeburg, Germany on December 14, 2013 where she placed 3rd runner-up.

== Early life ==
Before joining pageantry, she was a Pilipinas Got Talent Season 2 contestant, the Grand Prize winner in the Coca-Cola Music Talent Search Finals in 2011, and the Grand Winner of "My Girl," a pageant-like search on ABS-CBN.

== 2013: Mutya ng Pilipinas and Miss Intercontinental ==
Koreen won the top title of Mutya ng Pilipinas Asia Pacific International 2013 title for Miss Intercontinental together with co-winner, Angeli Dione Barbas Gomez, Mutya ng Pilipinas Tourism International 2013 for Miss Tourism International 2013 at the Mutya ng Pilipinas 2013 pageant.

She placed 3rd runner-up and chosen as Miss Intercontinental Queen of Asia and Oceania at the Miss Intercontinental 2013 pageant on December 14, 2013 in Magdeburg, Germany.

== 2015: StarStruck ==
In 2015, Medina joined the sixth season of StarStruck wherein she was one of the semi-finalists until eventually revealed as part of the Top 28 contestants on the show's pilot episode. She was joined by Klea Pineda and Avery Paraiso in that announcement.

== Filmography ==
=== Television ===
Year	Title	Role	Note
2011	Pilipinas Got Talent (season 2)	Herself / Contestant	
2012	Happy Yipee Yehey!	Herself / Contestant	"My Girl" Grand Winner
2013	The Voice of the Philippines	Herself / Contestant	
2015	StarStruck VI	Herself / Contestant	3rd Avenger
2016	Juan Happy Love Story	Lorraine	First daily role
2016	Maynila	Gayle	
2016	Maynila: Liwanag	Erika	Lead Role with Martin del Rosario
2016	Dear Uge: GGSS vs. GGSS	Katleen Del Rio	Episode Guest
2017	Pinulot Ka Lang sa Lupa	Laureen	Guest Cast / Antagonist
2017	Destined to be Yours	Marjorie Escobar	Supporting Cast / Antagonist
2017	Wowowin	Herself	Guest Host
2017	Haplos	Bar Dancer	Guest Appearance

== See also ==
- StarStruck (Philippine TV series)
- StarStruck (season 6)
