= Glow Up =

Philippine television infotainment show

- Title card
- Genre: Lifestyle; Infotainment
- Presented by: Winwyn Marquez; Thia Thomalla; Michelle Dee
- Country of origin: Philippines
- Original language: Tagalog

Production
- Camera setup: Multiple-camera setup
- Running time: 60 minutes
- Production company: GMA Entertainment Group

Original release
- Network: GMA News TV
- Release: June 9, 2019 – March 15, 2020

Glow Up is a Philippine television lifestyle infotainment show broadcast by GMA News TV. Hosted by Winwyn Marquez, Thia Thomalla and Michelle Dee, it premiered on June 9, 2019, on the network's Sunday evening line up. The show concluded on March 15, 2020.

== Premise ==
The show features tips and guides regarding fashion and lifestyle. Each episode will also feature a make-over transformation.

== Hosts ==
- Winwyn Marquez
- Thia Thomalla
- Michelle Dee

== Production ==
The production was halted in March 2020 due to the enhanced community quarantine in Luzon caused by the COVID-19 pandemic.

== Accolades ==
Accolades received by Glow Up
Year	Award	Category	Recipient	Result	Ref.
2019	33rd PMPC Star Awards for Television	Best Lifestyle Show	Glow Up	Nominated	
2019	33rd PMPC Star Awards for Television	Best Lifestyle Show Host	Winwyn Marquez Thia Thomalla Michelle Dee	Nominated	
2021	34th PMPC Star Awards for Television	Best Lifestyle Show	Glow Up	Nominated	
2021	34th PMPC Star Awards for Television	Best Lifestyle Show Host	Winwyn Marquez Thia Thomalla Michelle Dee	Nominated	
2023	35th PMPC Star Awards for Television	Best Lifestyle Show	Glow Up	Nominated	
2023	35th PMPC Star Awards for Television	Best Lifestyle Show Host	Winwyn Marquez Thia Thomalla Michelle Dee	Nominated	
