= Mutya ng Pilipinas 2013 =

- Date: 26 July 2013
- Presenters: Chris Tiu; Kirby Ann Basken; Kristine Caballero; Patricia Fernandez
- Venue: NBC Tent, Taguig, Metro Manila, Philippines
- Broadcaster: GMA Network
- Entrants: 31
- Placements: 10
- Winner: Koreen Medina; Quezon City
- Congeniality: Ivy Camille Villanueva; Central Luzon
- Best National Costume: Marichat Evaristo; Bacolor, Pampanga
- Photogenic: Zandra Flores; Pangasinan

Mutya ng Pilipinas 2013 was the 45th Mutya ng Pilipinas pageant, held at the NBC Tent, Taguig, Metro Manila, Philippines, on July 26, 2013.

Andrea Koreen Medina of Quezon City was crowned Mutya ng Pilipinas Asia Pacific International 2013 and Angeli Dione Gomez of Cebu City as Mutya ng Pilipinas Tourism International 2013 at the end of the event.

== Results ==
=== Placements ===
Color keys

- The contestant Won in an International pageant.
- The contestant was a Runner-Up in an International pageant.

Placement	Contestant	International Placement
Mutya ng Pilipinas Asia Pacific International 2013	#21 – Koreen Medina (Appointed – Mutya ng Pilipinas Intercontinental 2013)	3rd Runner-Up – Miss Intercontinental 2013
Mutya ng Pilipinas Tourism International 2013	#6 – Angeli Dione Gomez	Winner – Miss Tourism International 2013
1st Runner-Up	#13 – Maureen Ann Montagne	
2nd Runner-Up	#22 – Kristian Aubrey Nolasco	
Top 10	#9 – Zandra Flores; #15 – Asdis Lisa Karlsdottir; #16 – Joselle Mariano; #20 – Catherine Denise Trevino; #31 – Nazita Reyhanian	

=== Special title ===
Title	Contestant
Mutya ng Pilipinas Overseas Communities	#15 Iceland – Asdis Lisa Karlsdottir

=== Special awards ===
Award	Contestant
Mutya Best in Swimsuit	#29 – Vina Openiano
Mutya Best in Long Gown	#11 – Marichat Evaristo
Mutya Photogenic	#9 – Zandra Flores
Mutya Press Favorite	#9 – Zandra Flores
Mutya ng Sheridan	#21 – Koreen Medina
Mutya Best in Talent	#21 – Koreen Medina
Mutya ng Lancaster Hotel Manila	#21 – Koreen Medina
Mutya ng Careline by Ever Bilena	#21 – Koreen Medina
Mutya ng Zen Institute	#21 – Koreen Medina
Mutya People's Choice Awardee	#15 – Asdis Lisa Karlsdottir
Mutya Best in Philippine Costume	#11 – Marichat Evaristo
Mutya Friendship	#26 – Ivy Camille Villanueva
Mutya ng Crimson	#6 – Angeli Dione Gomez; #21 – Koreen Medina
Mutya ng Mags	#16 – Joselle Mariano
Mutya ng Informatics	#20 – Catherine Denise Trevino
Mutya ng IVI Collagen	#13 – Maureen Ann Montagne

== Contestants ==
Thirty-one contestants competed for the two titles.

No.	Contestant	Hometown
1	Allison Almario	Canada
2	Shella May Las Piñas	Dumaguete
3	Sumaya Abu Alhawala	Lipa
4	Alyanna Mikaela Cagandahan	Santa Cruz
5	Maria Elena Jose	Angeles
6	Angeli Dione Gomez	Cebu City
7	Princess Diana Mindermann	Bacolod
8	Jenny Vhet Zabate	Lapu-Lapu
9	Zandra Flores	Pangasinan
10	Marjorie Acuña	Gerona
11	Marichat Evaristo	Bacolor
12	Jessarie Dumaguing	Palawan
13	Maureen Ann Montagne	Arizona
14	Tishiana Mann	California
15	Asdis Liza Karlsdottir	Iceland
16	Joselle Mariano	Cavite City
17	Crizel Jayn Quidlat	Iligan
18	Jan Krisnah Catague	Iloilo
19	Greta Lovisa Buco	Santa Rosa
20	Catherine Denise Trivino	Tarlac City
21	Koreen Medina	Quezon City
22	Kristian Aubrey Nolasco	Caloocan
23	Ednorance Agustin	Davao City
24	Madison Elliot	Maryland
25	Hazel Cabuyao	Laguna
26	Ivy Camille Villanueva	Central Luzon
27	Victoria Humblet	Germany
28	Precious Joy Masiclat	Mabalacat
29	Vina Openiano	Laguna
30	Nelda Ibe	Tarlac
31	Nazita Reyhanian	Scandinavia
