= Miss World Philippines 2018 =

8th Miss World Philippines pageant

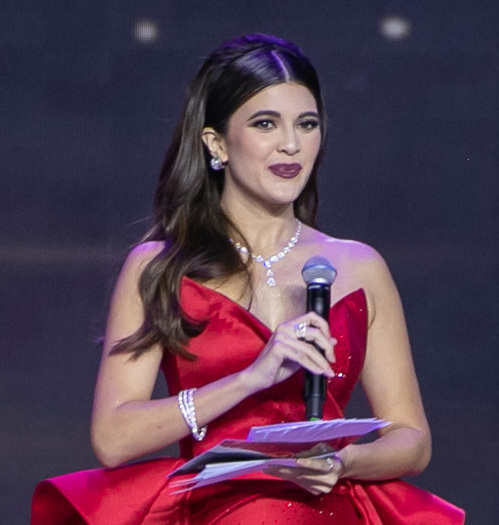
- Katarina Rodriguez
- Date: October 7, 2018
- Presenters: Francisco Escobar; Ruffa Gutierrez; Carla Abellana
- Venue: SM Mall of Asia Arena, Bay City, Metro Manila, Philippines
- Broadcaster: GMA Network
- Entrants: 40
- Placements: 16
- Winner: Katarina Rodriguez; Davao City
- Photogenic: Chanel Morales, Makati

Miss World Philippines 2018 was the eighth Miss World Philippines pageant, held at the SM Mall of Asia Arena in Pasay, Metro Manila, Philippines on, October 7, 2018.

Laura Lehmann crowned Katarina Rodriguez as her successor at the end of the event. Rodriguez represented the Philippines at Miss World 2018 in Sanya, China. The event was attended by Miss World 2016 Stephanie Del Valle of Puerto Rico, Miss World 2017 Manushi Chhillar of India, and the chairperson of the Miss World organization Julia Morley.

== Results ==
=== Placements ===
Color keys

- The contestant was a runner-up in an international pageant.
- The contestant was a semi-finalist in an international pageant.
- The contestant did not place.

Placement	Contestant	International Placement
Miss World Philippines 2018	#27 – Katarina Rodriguez	Unplaced – Miss World 2018
Miss Eco Philippines 2018	#16 – Maureen Montagne	1st Runner-Up – Miss Eco International 2019
Reina Hispanoamericana Filipinas 2018	#33 – Alyssa Muhlach	Unplaced – Reina Hispanoamericana 2018
Miss Multinational Philippines 2018	#35 – Kimilei Mugford	Top 5 – Miss Multinational 2018
First Princess	#39 – Chanel Morales	
Second Princess	#11 – Pearl Hung	
Top 10	#5 – Kim De Guzman; #23 – Marianne Marquez; #32 – Kylah Sanchez; #34 – Danielle Joie Magno	
Top 16	#6 – Marie Danica Reynes; #9 – Arienne Louise Calingo; #10 – Pauline Labayo; #14 – Monique Tuzon; #21 – Annalita Vizcarra; #31 – Cleopatra Jones	

=== Special awards ===
Award	Contestant	Ref.
Miss Photogenic	#39 – Chanel Morales	
Best in Long Gown	#27 – Katarina Rodriguez	
Miss BlueWater Day Spa	#16 – Maureen Montagne	
Miss BlueWater Day Spa	#27 – Katarina Rodriguez	
Miss Best Skin	#33 – Alyssa Muhlach	
Miss Cosmo Skin	#27 – Katarina Rodriguez	
Miss Tanduay	#16 – Maureen Montagne	
Miss Erase Plantcenta	#33 – Alyssa Muhlach	
Miss Erase Plantcenta	#39 – Chanel Morales	
Miss BYS Philippines	#33 – Alyssa Muhlach	
Miss Philippine Airlines	#16 – Maureen Montagne	
Miss GCOX	#16 – Maureen Montagne	
Miss GCOX	#33 – Alyssa Muhlach	
Miss Resorts World Manila	#27 – Katarina Rodriguez	
Miss Bench Body	#27 – Katarina Rodriguez	

== Events ==
=== Fast Track Events ===
Event	Winner	Finalists
Talent Competition	#6 – Marie Danica Reynes	#7 – Angeline Mae Santos; #10 – Paulina Labayo; #25 – Crystal Freedman; #30 – Rose Marie Murphy; #33 – Alyssa Muhlach; #35 – Kimilei Mugford
Sports Competition	#35 – Kimilei Mugford	#4 – Inna Penales; #5 – Kim De Guzman; #12 – Neesha Murjani; #19 – Jerelleen Rodriguez; #23 – Marianne Marquez; #27 – Katarina Rodriguez; #30 – Rose Marie Murphy; #31 – Cleopatra Jones; #36 – Crissia del Atienza
Beach Beauty	#27 – Katarina Rodriguez	#11 – Pearl Hung; #16 – Maureen Montagne; #20 – Angelica Estrevillo; #32 – Kylah Sanchez; #33 – Alyssa Muhlach; #39 - Chanel Morales
Top Model	#16 – Maureen Montagne	#5 – Kim De Guzman; #23 – Marianne Marquez; #27 – Katarina Rodriguez; #33 – Alyssa Muhlach; #34 – Denielle Joie Magno; #38 – Katrina Acaylar
Multimedia	#33 – Alyssa Muhlach	#1 – Erica Larkins; #15 – Maisa Llanes; #27 – Katarina Rodriguez; #28 – Abby Dizor; #30 – Rose Marie Murphy; #39 – Chanel Morales
Charity	#5 – Kim De Guzman	#12 - Neesha Murjani; #13 - Michelle Oliva; #33 - Alyssa Muhlach; #35 - Kimilei Mugford

== Judges ==
- Kiko Estrada - Actor
- Louie Heredia - Composer and hitmaker
- Dr. Noel Fajardo - Gastroenterologist
- Mark Striegl - Mixed martial artist fighter
- Tati Fortuna - Fashion designer
- David Semerad - PBA basketball player
- Dr. Filippo Cremonini - Gastroenterologist
- Ariella Arida - Miss Universe 2013 3rd Runner-up
- Cathy Valencia - CEO, Cathy Valencia Advanced Skin Clinic
- Stephen Reilly - CEO, Resorts World Manila
- Arch. Miguel Pastor - Architect
- Stephanie Del Valle - Miss World 2016 from Puerto Rico
- Ivo Buchta - Austrian international model
- Tony Chua - President & CEO, iFace Inc.
- Manushi Chhillar - Miss World 2017 from India
- Nenita Lim - VP of Finance, Suyen Corporation
- Jeffrey Lin - CEO, GCOX
- Megan Young - Miss World Philippines 2013 and Miss World 2013
- Francis Tolentino - Secretary and Presidential Adviser for Political Affairs
- Bato dela Rosa - former PNP chief and Current Director General of Bureau of Corrections
- Vivienne Tan - Executive Vice President, Commercial Group at Philippine Airlines

== Contestants ==
40 contestants competed for the four titles.

No.	Contestant	Age (Note: Ages at the time of the pageant)	Hometown
1	Erica Larkins	25	Muntinlupa
2	Jigg Kirsty Ang	23	Catanduanes
3	Barmae Aica Chua	21	Caloocan
4	Inna Penales	23	Parañaque
5	Kim de Guzman	26	Olongapo
6	Marie Danica Reynes	26	Pampanga
7	Angeline Mae Santos	24	Manila
8	Pauline Deveraturda	22	Botolan, Zambales
9	Arienne Louise Calingo	26	Angeles
10	Paulina Labayo	21	Naga, Camarines Sur
11	Pearl Hung	25	Palawan
12	Namrata Neesha Murjani	25	Cebu City
13	Michelle Oliva	24	Davao City
14	Monique Tuzon	25	Quezon City
15	Maisa Llanes	25	Taguig
16	Maureen Montagne	25	Batangas
17	Maria Divine Angela Veranga	25	Metro Manila
18	Kathryn Jade Cudiamat	26	Rizal
19	Jerelleen Alix Rodriguez	26	Nasugbu
20	Angelica Estrevillo	19	Iloilo City
21	Annalita Vizcarra	23	Dasmariñas
22	Elaiza Alzona	22	Zambales
23	Marianne Marquez	26	Marikina
24	Eiffel Rosalita	22	Bulacan
25	Crystal Freedman	24	California
26	Joemay-an Leo	22	Cordillera
27	Katarina Rodriguez	26	Davao
28	Abbyjun Dizor	25	Valenzuela
29	Mary Jeanne Boniao	25	Misamis Oriental
30	Rose Marie Murphy	26	Agusan del Norte
31	Cleopatra Jones	18	Los Angeles
32	Kylah Sanchez	16	Compostela
33	Alyssa Muhlach Alvarez	22	Pasig
34	Denielle Joie Magno	25	Pangasinan
35	Kimilei Mugford	18	Canada
36	Crissia del Atienza	26	Oriental Mindoro
37	Gianna Llanes	23	Palayan, Nueva Ecija
38	Katrina Acaylar	22	Cagayan de Oro
39	Chanel Morales	22	Makati
40	Tamara Caballero	18	Mandaluyong

=== Withdrawals ===
- Maria Gail Tobes left the competition and was replaced by Maisa Llanes.

== Notes ==
=== Post-pageant notes ===
- Katarina Rodriguez competed at Miss World 2018 in Sanya, China and did not reach the semifinals. Alyssa Muhlach Alvarez did not reach the semifinals of the Reina Hispanoamericana 2018 pageant in Bolivia.
- Maureen Montagne finished as first runner-up at Miss Eco International 2019 in Egypt. On May 28, 2020, it was announced that Montagne would become Miss Eco International 2019 title after the original winner, Suheyn Cipriani of Peru, was removed. On May 30, 2020, it was announced that the fourth runner-up, Amy Tinie Abdul Aziz of Malaysia, would replace her due to as Montagne had declined the offer as she was competing at Binibining Pilipinas 2021. She was then crowned at Binibining Pilipinas 2021 as Binibining Pilipinas Globe 2021, and then won The Miss Globe 2021 in Tirana, Albania.
- Kimilei Mugford competed at Miss Multinational 2018 in New Delhi, India, finishing in the top five, and also winning the Sports Challenge event.
