= Wilson Lee Flores =

Filipino writer and entrepreneur

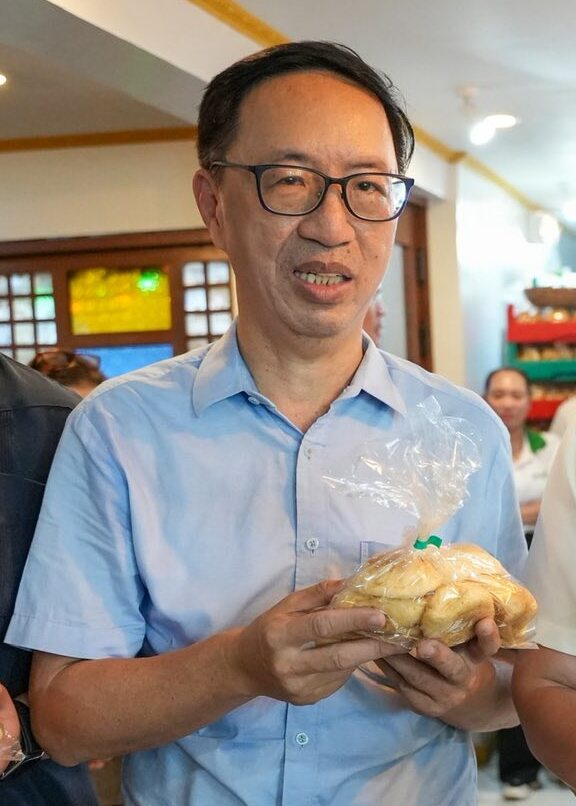
- Lee Flores during World Pandesal Day in 2025
- Born: Wilson Lee Flores
- Education: Ateneo de Manila University (BS)
- Relatives: Dee C. Chuan (second cousin)

Wilson Lee Flores is a multi-awarded Philippine writer, entrepreneur, educator, poet, philanthropist, and political-economic analyst.

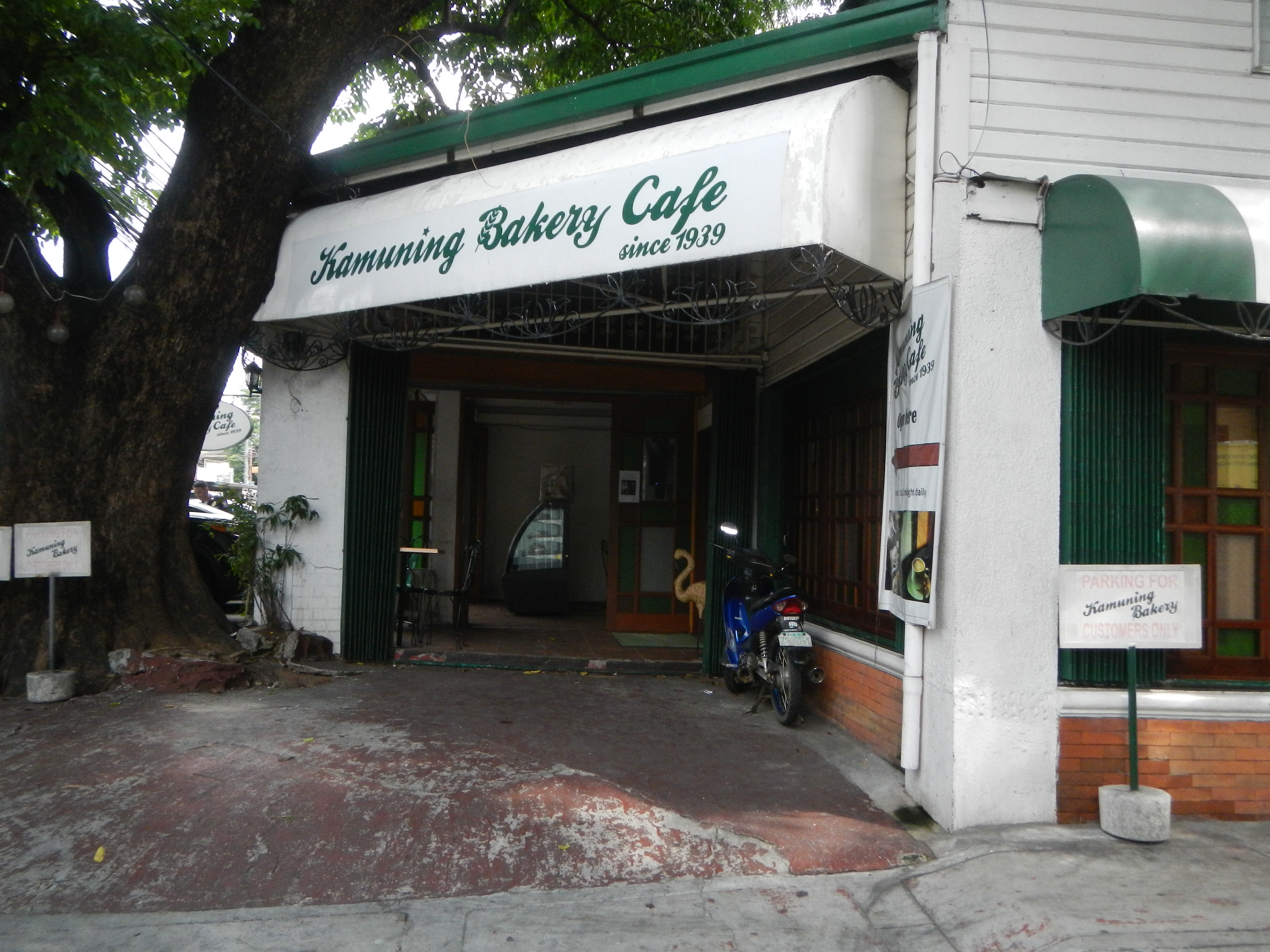
1939 Kamuning Bakery façade with narra tree

He has won 15 Catholic Mass Media Awards (CMMA) for his Philippine Star newspaper columns called "Will Soon Flourish" and three Don Carlos Palanca Memorial Awards for Literature. He has also been honored with three CMMA Hall of Fame Awards, including CMMA Hall of Fame Awards for "Best Opinion Column", and "Best Business Column".

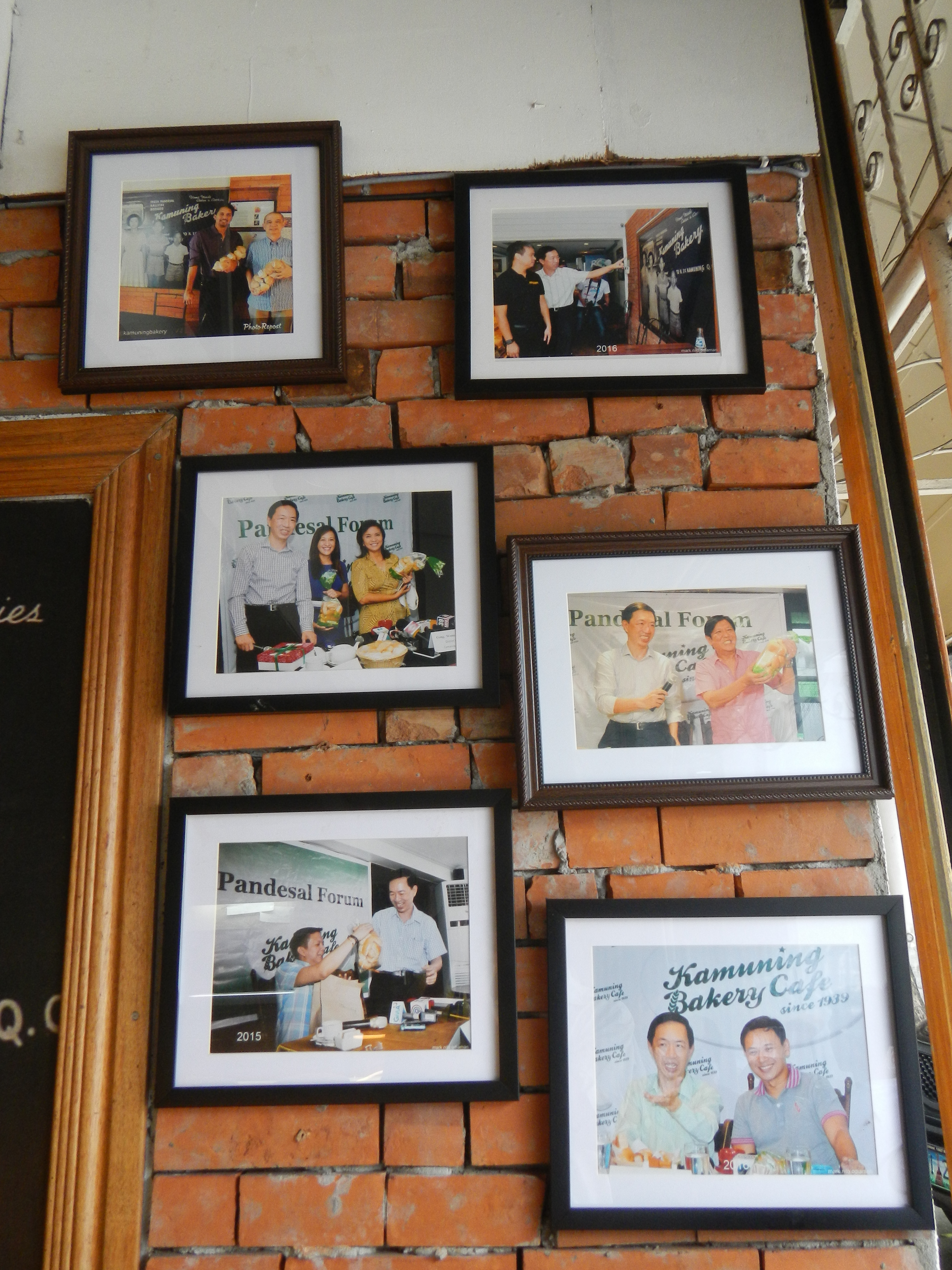
Lee Flores, pandesal forum

== Career ==
=== Writing ===
Flores began writing when he was still in college at the Ateneo de Manila University. In 1987, Flores won first prize in the essay category of the 1987 Palanca Awards for "The Legacy of the Old-Chinese Merchants of Manila”. His two other essays “Don Jose Ma. Basa, the Untold Saga of an Illustrado Patriot” and “Gen. Macario Sakay and the Katagalugan Republic vs. the United States”, also won third place.

Flores then went on to write columns for the Philippine Star, which went on to win multiple awards.

=== Entrepreneurship ===
In January 2014, he bought the historic and pioneering Kamuning Bakery (now Kamuning Bakery Café) of Barangay Kamuning, Quezon City; this is Quezon City's first bakery which was established in 1939. Upon Alejandro Roces' invitation, lawyer Leticia Bonifacio Javier, daughter of Singalong, Malate, Manila's Los Baños Bakery’s proprietor, and spouse Marcelo founded Kamuning Bakery, along 43 Judge Jimenez Corner K-1st Street, Project 1. Kamuning is derived from Kamuning which surrounded the Barangay. In February 2018, a fire razed the iconic bakery, and what only remained is its façade, 2 clay ovens, a bookcase, and the pterocarpus indicus. Flores, however, restored it by 2019.

He is moderator of the café's non-partisan, issues-focused and tertulia-inspired "Pandesal Forum", where leaders and newsmakers dialogue with media and intellectuals. Among the diverse speakers at the Pandesal Forum include President Ferdinand "Bongbong" R. Marcos, Senator Imee Marcos, former Vice-President Leni Robredo, former Supreme Court Chief Justice Maria Lourdes Sereno, former Senator Panfilo "Ping" Lacson, two United States Ambassadors, two Russia Ambassadors, two China Ambassadors, two Singapore Ambassadors, British Ambassador, Ukraine Ambassador, Cuba Ambassador, and more.

Since 2015, Flores has led the Kamuning Bakery-Café in celebrating "World Pandesal Day" every October 16 (globally known as "World Bread Day" and "World Food Day"). "World Pandesal Day" is celebrated in order to honor the Philippines' most popular bread pan de sal and as a reminder of the need to solve the age-old problem of hunger.

== Awards and recognition ==
Among the various awards and honors conferred on Wilson Lee Flores include the Gawad Manual L. Quezon Award which is Quezon City government's highest honor for outstanding citizens of the Philippines' biggest city; the Supremo Award conferred by the Grace Christian College; the Award for the Promotion of Philippines China Understanding (APPCU) from the Association for Philippines China Understanding (APCU) and conferred by First Lady Liza Araneta Marcos and Senator Koko Pimentel; and others.

To commemorate World Food Day-"World Pandesal Day" on October 16, 2024, Lee Flores' 100,000 pandesal were given to Sinait Integrated School, Tarlac City students and teacher. Further, Lee Flores and the Federation of Filipino Chinese Chambers of Commerce & Industry donated a school building for Sinait school.
