= Miss Eco International 2018 =

4th Miss Eco International edition

- Date: April 27, 2018
- Hosts: Jerry Nayna; Nancy Magdy
- Venue: Cairo Opera Theatre; Zamalek, Cairo, Egypt
- Entrants: 51
- Placements: 21
- Debuts: Ecuador; Fernando de Noronha; Ghana; Nigeria; Peru; Dominican Republic; South Sudan; Suriname; Tunisia; Tuva; Uruguay; Zambia
- Withdrawals: Albania; Algeria; Australia; Chile; Kazakhstan; Kenya; Kyrgyzstan; Kosovo; Croatia; Macau; Malta; Moldova; Paraguay; Puerto Rico; Rodrigues; Romania; New Zealand; Singapore; Ukraine; Greece; Zimbabwe
- Returns: Bolivia; Haiti; Lebanon; Slovenia
- Winner: Cynthia Magpatoc Thomalla; Philippines
- Best National Costume: Melanie Eileen Ulloa Acosta; Panama
- Photogenic: Vivianne Félix da Silva; Fernando de Noronha

Miss Eco International 2018 was the fourth edition of Miss Eco International held on Cairo Opera Theatre, Zamalek, Cairo, Egypt on April 27, 2018.

A total of 51 contestants competed and at the end of the event Amber Lynn Bernachi from Canada crowned her successor Cynthia Magpatoc Thomalla from the Philippines marking the first victory of the Philippines at Miss Eco International.

== Results ==
=== Placements ===
Placement	Contestant
Miss Eco International 2018	Philippines – Cynthia Thomalla
1st Runner-Up	Indonesia – Astira Intan Vernadeina
2nd Runner-Up	Peru – Kelin Rivera
3rd Runner-Up	Vietnam – Nguyễn Thị Dung
4th Runner-Up	Costa Rica – Glennys Medina
Top 10	Brazil – Daiane Garcia Savi; Egypt – Hadeer Tariq; India – Naseema Arewale; Poland – Karina Pochwala; Portugal – Priscila da Silva Alves
Top 21	China – Zhao Yuanxin; Colombia – Lina Contreras; Ecuador – Diana Aracelly Morales; Malaysia – Adriana Anak Terrence; Mauritius – Marie-Désirée Sabrina Laetitia; Mexico – Mara Orduño Arce; Nigeria – Blessing Akhigbe; Russia – Kseniya Klepikova; Serbia – Hristina Vujinović; Suriname – Kimberley Naarendorp; Venezuela – Leix Collins

=== Continental Queens ===
Continental Titles	Contestant
Miss Eco Africa	South Africa – Izelle Van
Miss Eco America	United States – Jessica Jewel Vangaleen
Miss Eco Latin America	Bulgaria – Lina Carter
Miss Eco Asia	Thailand – Natascha Pedersen
Miss Eco Europe	Colombia – Lina Daniela Daza Contreras

=== Special awards ===
Awards	Winners
Best National Costume	Panama – Melanie Eileen Ulloa Acosta
Miss Photogenic	Fernando de Noronha – Vivianne Felix da Silva
Miss Congeniality	Slovenia – Tamara Fišter
Miss Tourism Video	Indonesia – Astira Intan Vernadeina
Best Smile	Japan – Arisa Katsumoto
Miss Teen	Myanmar – Kha Kha San
Best Eco Dress Designer	China – Zhao Yuanxin
Miss Vartika	Peru – Kelin Rivera
Resorts Wear Competition	Ecuador – Diana Aracelly Palacios Morales
Best Eco Dress Competition	Vietnam– Nguyễn Thị Dung
Eco Talent	Portugal – Priscila da Silva Alves

== Candidates ==
51 contestant confirmed competing for the title:

Country/Territory	Contestant
Bashkortostan	Regina Mukhamadieva
Belarus	Maryna Famina
Belgium	Lore Ven
Bolivia	Wendy Saavedra Franco
Brazil	Daiane Garcia Savi
Bulgaria	Lina Carter
Canada	Alyssa Boston
China	Zhao Yuanxin
Colombia	Lina Daniela Daza Contreras
Costa Rica	Glennys Dayana Medina Segura
Dominican Republic	Perla Mabel Vasquez Diaz
Ecuador	Diana Aracelly Palacios Morales
Egypt	Hadeer Tariq
Fernando de Noronha	Vivianne Felix da Silva
France	Pauline Leulteuy
Germany	Mariella Ruck
Ghana	Veronica Sarfo Adu Nti
Haiti	Cassandre Joseph
India	Naseema Arewale
Indonesia	Astira Intan Vernadeina
Japan	Arisa Katsumoto
Lebanon	Cedra Khadra
Malaysia	Adriana Anak Terrence
Mauritius	Marie-Désirée Sabrina Laetitia Bègue
Mexico	Mara Orduño Arce
Montenegro	Aida Redzovic
Myanmar	Kha Kha San
Nepal	Maunata Lama
Nigeria	Omoye Blessing Akhigbe
Pakistan	Diya Ali (Madeeha Naseer)
Panama	Melanie Eileen Ulloa Acosta
Peru	Kelin Poldy Rivera Kroll
Philippines	Cynthia Magpatoc Thomalla
Poland	Karina Pochwala
Portugal	Priscila da Silva Alves
Russia	Kseniya Olegovna Klepikova
Serbia	Hristina Vujinović
Slovenia	Tamara Fišter
Spain	Sara Torres Trujillo
South Sudan	Amelia Aboud Michael Sky
Suriname	Kimberley Naarendorp de Randamie
Thailand	Natascha Pedersen
Tunisia	Zoubeida Hentati
Tuva	Shoraana Ondar
Uruguay	Fiorella Marzano Machado
United States	Jessica Jewel Vangaleen
Venezuela	Leix Montilla Collins
Vietnam	Nguyễn Thư Dung
Zambia	Katrina Ketty Kabaso
