= Maureen Montagne =

Filipino-American beauty pageant titleholder (born 1993)

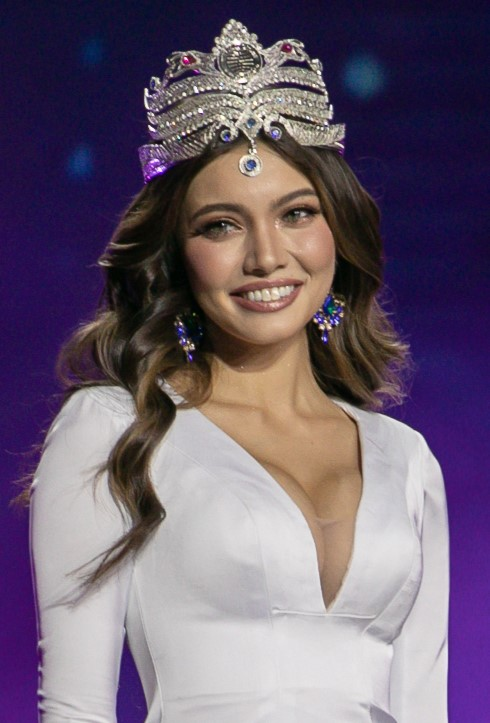
- Montagne in 2021
- Born: Maureen Ann Hiwatig Montagne; July 10, 1993 (age 33); St. Albans, Vermont, U.S.
- Education: Arizona State University
- Height: 1.70 m (5 ft 7 in)
- Beauty pageant titleholder
- Title: Miss Arizona USA 2015; Miss Eco Philippines 2018; Binibining Pilipinas Globe 2021; The Miss Globe 2021
- Years active: 2013–present
- Major competitions: Mutya ng Pilipinas 2013; (1st Runner-Up); Miss Arizona USA 2015; (Winner); Miss USA 2015; (Top 15); Miss World America 2017; (1st Runner-Up); Miss World Philippines 2018; (Winner – Miss Eco Philippines 2018); Miss Eco International 2019; (1st Runner-Up); Binibining Pilipinas 2021; (Winner – Binibining Pilipinas Globe 2021); The Miss Globe 2021; (Winner)

Maureen Ann Hiwatig Montagne (English: /ˈmɒnteɪŋ/ MON-tayng; Tagalog: [maʊˈɾin mɔnˈtɛɪ̯n]; born July 10, 1993) is a Filipino and American beauty pageant titleholder who was crowned The Miss Globe 2021. Before that, she held the title of Binibining Pilipinas Globe 2021.

Previously, she won Miss Arizona USA 2015 and reached the top 15 at Miss USA 2015. She was also hailed as Miss Eco Philippines 2018 at the Miss World Philippines 2018 competition and finished first runner-up at the Miss Eco International 2019 pageant.

== Personal life ==
Maureen Ann Montagne was born July 10, 1993, in St. Albans, Vermont. After the age of three, she moved to Chandler, Arizona, where she was raised. She is of Filipino and French descent. She went back to the Philippines to compete in various national pageants. Montagne graduated from Arizona State University with a degree in interdisciplinary studies.

== Pageantry ==
=== Mutya ng Pilipinas 2013 ===
Montagne competed for her first Philippine national pageant in Mutya ng Pilipinas 2013. She finished as the first runner-up.

=== Miss Arizona USA 2015 ===
Montagne competed in and won Miss Arizona USA representing Tempe, Arizona. With this she competed at Miss USA 2015.

=== Miss USA 2015 ===
Montagne competed in Miss USA 2015, reaching the top 15.

=== Miss World America 2017 ===
Montagne joined the Miss World America 2017 where she placed first runner-up to Clarissa Bowers of Florida.

=== Miss World Philippines 2018 ===
Montagne competed at Miss World Philippines 2018 where she won Miss Eco Philippines 2018.

=== Miss Eco International 2019 ===
After winning Miss Eco Philippines 2018, Montagne represented the Philippines at Miss Eco International 2019, held in Cairo, Egypt. She finished as first runner-up to Miss Peru's Suheyn Cipriani who was later removed due to pregnancy. As the first runner-up she would automatically become the winner, but she refused the title due to her commitments with Binibining Pilipinas.

=== Binibining Pilipinas 2021 ===
Montagne joined the Binibining Pilipinas 2021 where she won Binibining Pilipinas Globe 2021, giving her the right to compete at The Miss Globe 2021.

=== The Miss Globe 2021 ===
Montagne represented the Philippines and surpassed over 40 candidates to win The Miss Globe 2021 crown in Tirana, Albania, on November 5, 2021.

Awards and achievements
Preceded by (Kosovo) Lorinda Kolgeci	The Miss Globe; 2021	Succeeded by (Dominican Republic) Anabel Payano
Preceded by Leren Bautista (Laguna)	Binibining Pilipinas Globe; 2021	Succeeded by Chelsea Fernandez (Tacloban)
Preceded by Cynthia Thomalla (Southern Leyte)	Miss Eco Philippines; 2018	Succeeded by Kelley Day (Tarlac City)
Preceded by Jordan Wessel	Miss Arizona USA; 2015	Succeeded by Chelsea Myers
