= Winwyn Marquez =

Filipino actress and beauty pageant titleholder

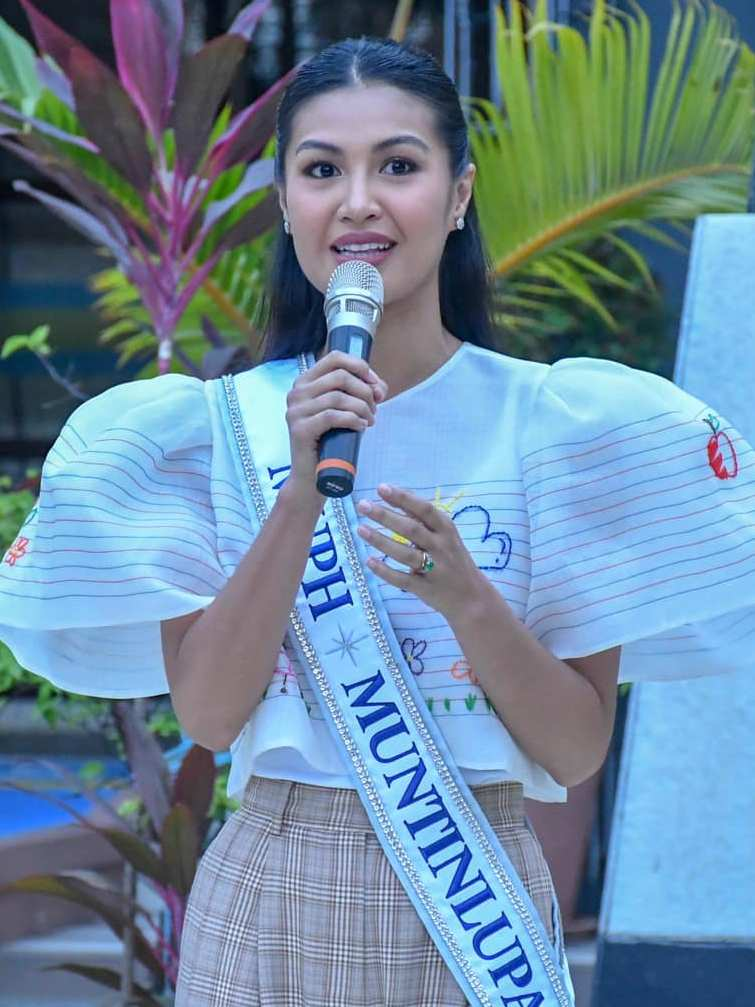
- Marquez in 2025
- Born: Teresita Ssen Lacsamana Marquez; Parañaque, Metro Manila, Philippines
- Education: San Beda College - Alabang; Southville International School and Colleges
- Occupation: Actress
- Height: 5 ft 6 in (168 cm)
- Children: 1
- Parents: Joey Marquez (father); Alma Moreno (mother)
- Relatives: Vandolph Quizon (half-brother); Mark Anthony Fernandez (half-brother); Zia Marquez (half sister); Melanie Marquez (aunt); Michelle Dee (cousin)
- Beauty pageant titleholder
- Title: Reina Hispanoamericana Filipinas 2017; Reina Hispanoamericana 2017
- Years active: 2004–present
- Major competitions: Binibining Pilipinas 2015; (Top 15); Miss World Philippines 2017; (Winner – Reina Hispanoamericana Filipinas 2017); Reina Hispanoamericana 2017; (Winner); Miss Universe Philippines 2025; (1st Runner-Up)
- Military career
- Allegiance: Philippines
- Branch: Philippine Navy; Naval Reserve Command
- Service years: 2020–present
- Rank: Master Sergeant

Teresita Ssen Lacsamana Marquez (Tagalog pronunciation: [maɾˈkɛs]), popularly known as Winwyn Marquez, is a Filipino actress and beauty pageant titleholder who was crowned the first Reina Hispanoamericana Filipinas title at Miss World Philippines 2017 and also won the Reina Hispanoamericana 2017 title in Santa Cruz, Bolivia on November 4, 2017.

== Early life and education ==
Marquez has a degree in Bachelor of Science in Business Administration Major in Marketing Management at San Beda College Alabang and has earned her Teachers Certificate at Southville International School and Colleges.

She was born to actor-politician Joey Marquez and actress-politician Alma Moreno and went on to become a dancer and actress.

Marquez is the half-sister of Mark Anthony Fernandez and Vandolph Quizon. She is also the niece of Miss International 1979 Melanie Marquez. She is also a cousin of Michelle Marquez Dee Miss World Philippines 2019 and Miss Universe Philippines 2023.

Since 2012, Alden Richards and Michael De Mesa joined her to be a supporting cast and guest cast in One True Love and Valiente.

== Pageantry ==
=== Binibining Pilipinas 2015 ===
Marquez was an official candidate for Binibining Pilipinas 2015 that was held at the Smart Araneta Coliseum on March 15, 2015. She represented Parañaque City. She finished as a top 15 finalist and also won the Best National Costume, Miss Talent and She's So JAG awards.

=== Miss World Philippines 2017 ===
Marquez was an official candidate for Miss World Philippines 2017. The pageant happened in Mall of Asia Arena on September 3, 2017 which was hosted by Iya Villania-Arellano, KC Montero, and Carla Abellana where she was crowned Reina Hispanoamericana Filipinas 2017. Marquez also won awards the Miss Savoy Hotel Boracay, Fast Track Talent and Fast Track Beach Beauty (Miss Bench Body) awards.

=== Reina Hispanoamericana 2017 ===
She represented the Philippines at the Reina Hispanoamericana 2017 pageant that was held in Santa Cruz, Bolivia. She is the first-ever representative of the Philippines and the only Asian candidate in the pageant. At the conclusion of the event, she was crowned the winner and bagged the Miss Ipanema award.

=== Miss Universe Philippines 2025 ===
Marquez competed in the Miss Universe Philippines 2025 pageant representing Muntinlupa. She finished as first runner-up at the pageant's coronation night on May 2, 2025, and afterwards announced her retirement from pageantry.

== Filmography ==
=== Film ===
Year	Title	Role	Notes
2013	10,000 Hours	Sandra	Supporting role
2018	Unli Life	Victoria	Protagonist
2019	Time & Again	Apol	Protagonist
2021	Nelia	Nelia	Protagonist
2023	The Cheating Game	Attorney Vanessa	

=== Television ===
Year	Title	Role	Notes
2004–2010	ASAP	Herself (host)	
2005	Candies	Herself (host)	
2006	O-Ha!	Various	
2010–2013	Party Pilipinas	Herself	
2011	Elena M. Patron's Blusang Itim	Cleo Salcedo	
2012	Hiram na Puso	Jillian	
2012	One True Love	Marla Samonte	
2013	Indio	María	
2013	Dormitoryo	Maika "Maiks" Benitez / Danica Benitez	
2013	Magpakailanman: Ang Baby Prosti: The Baby Tsina Story	Young Baby Tsina	
2013–2015	Sunday All Stars	Herself (performer)	
2013–2015	The Ryzza Mae Show	Herself (guest)	
2014	Kambal Sirena	Macy Montero†	
2014	Magpakailanman: Ang Pusong Hindi Makalimot	Young Faith Bacon	
2014	Wagas: Joreen & Samuel Love Story	Joreen Apuyan-Trostle	
2015	Ang Lihim ni Annasandra	Tiana	
2015	The Half Sisters	Vanessa Rodriguez	85 episodes Also credited as Wynwyn Marquez
2015	Magpakailanman: Sex Slave: Anak, Pinabayaan ng Ina?: The Belen and Ayen Story	Ayen	
2015	Wowowin	Herself (co-host)	
2015	Little Nanay	Beatrice	
2015	Karelasyon: Pamana	Myra	
2015	Wagas: Jeffrey & Hope Libiran Love Story	Hope Libiran	
2015	Magpakailanman: Isang Mister, Lima tayong Asawa	Clarissa	
2016	Karelasyon: Gold Digger	Sheila	
2016	A1 Ko Sa 'Yo	Tricia	
2016	Wagas: Riding in Tandem	Sofia	
2016	Magpakailanman: Maid For Each Other	Elena	
2016	Karelasyon: Naglahong Pangarap	Agnes	
2017	Encantadia	Helgad	
2017	Magpakailanman: Love Is Complicated - The Edgar Mendoza Story	Shiela	
2017	Road Trip	Herself (guest)	
2017	Mulawin vs. Ravena	Ribay†	
2017	The Lolas' Beautiful Show	Herself (guest)	
2018	Magpakailanman: Our Miracle Baby	Gina	
2018	Tadhana: Hero Yayas	Joyce	
2019	Daddy's Gurl	Therese	
2019	Imbestigador: Titser	Cheryl Dologuin	
2019	Dahil sa Pag-ibig	Portia Reyes-Corpuz†	
2019–2020	Glow Up	Herself (host)	
2020	Beauty Queens	Cristina De Veyra / Tingting	
2020	I Can See You: High-Rise Lovers	Ysabel Mendiola	
2021	Owe My Love	Trixie Gibbs	
2021	Eat Bulaga!	Herself (guest co-host)	
2022	The Wall Philippines	Herself (contestant)	
2023	Mga Lihim ni Urduja	Dayang Iloguin	
2024	Tahanang Pinakamasaya	Herself (host)	
2024	Lilet Matias: Attorney-at-Law	Feliz Guerrero	
2025	Mommy Dearest	Astrid Zamora	
2025	Tadhana: Boss Yaya	Gabriela	
2026	Never Say Die	Theresa Park / Liza de Leon	
2026	Pinoy Big Brother: Collab 3.0	Herself (Housemate)	

== Personal life ==
Marquez has one child.

Awards and achievements
Preceded by (Colombia) Maria Camila Soleibe	Reina Hispanoamericana; 2017	Succeeded by (Venezuela) Nariman Battikha
Preceded by Inaugural	Reina Hispanoamericana Filipinas; 2017	Succeeded by Alyssa Muhlach Alvarez
