= Kamuning Bakery Cafe =

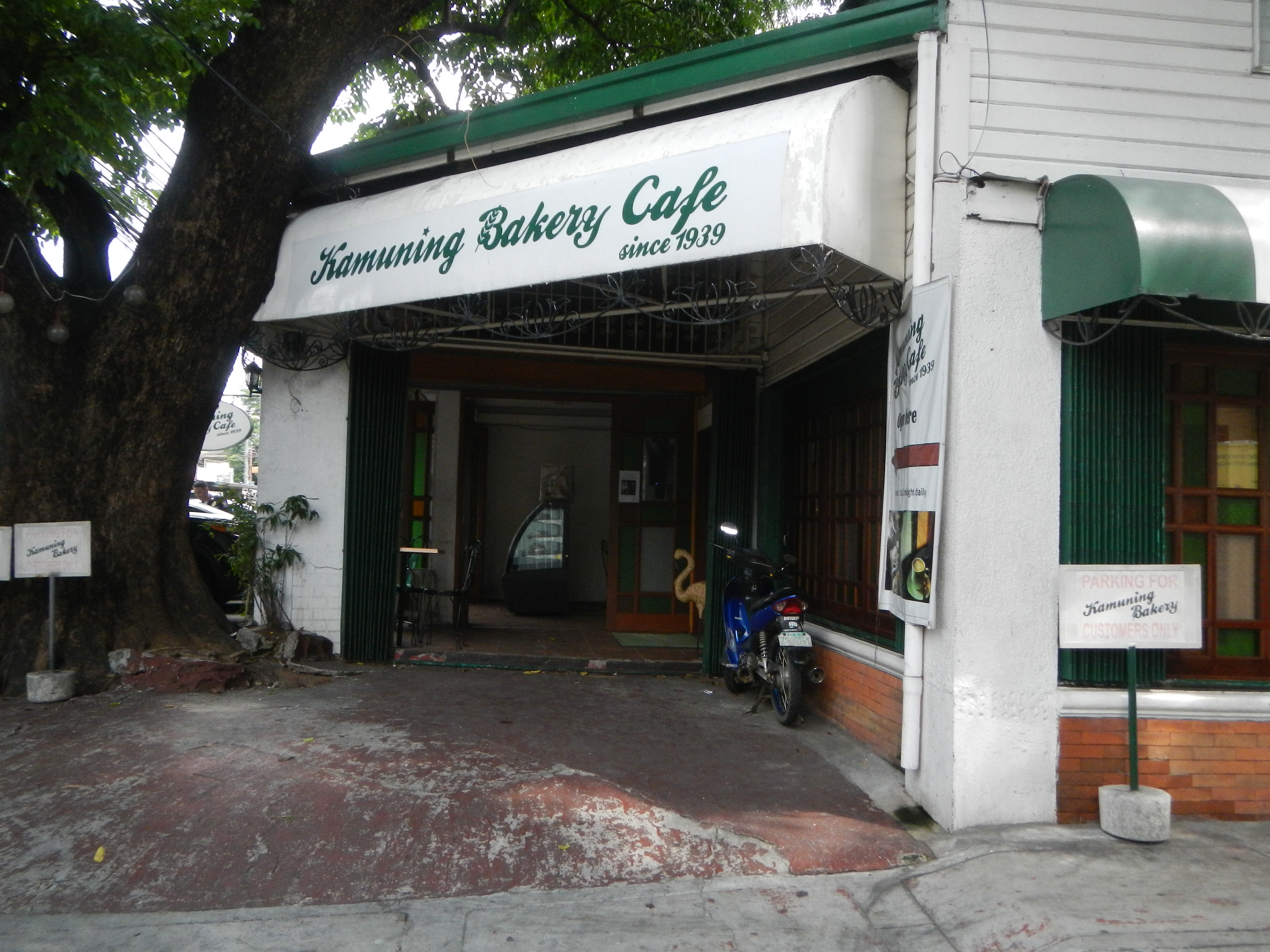
- The bakery in 2016
- Interactive map of Kamuning Bakery Cafe

Restaurant information
- Established: 1939
- Owner: Wilson Lee Flores
- Previous owners: Marcelo and Leticia Javier; Teddy Javier
- Food type: Bread and pastries
- Location: 43 Judge Jimenez Street cor. K-1 Street, Quezon City, Philippines
- Coordinates: 14°37′40.8″N 121°02′19.2″E
- Other locations: SM North EDSA (former)

The Kamuning Bakery Cafe is a historic bakery in Quezon City, Metro Manila, Philippines.

== History ==
=== Javier management ===
The Kamuning Bakery was established by Marcelo Javier and Leticia Bonifacio in 1939. Businessman Alejandro Roces who was an associate of Manuel L. Quezon convinced Bonifacio to set up a branch of Los Baños Bakery of Manila in the then-newly incorporated Quezon City. Instead a bakery under a different brand was set up.

Operation was disrupted during the Japanese occupation of the Philippines of World War II. Marcelo Javier were among the casualties of war. When the war ended, Leticia Bonifacio continued operating the bakery. Her son, Teddy Javier took over the bakery and was delivering bread to New Frontier, South Supermarket and KFC outlets in Manila. The Javiers tried to keep the bakery operational until in 2013 when they decided to sell the property occupied by the bakery.

=== Flores management ===
In December 2013, the bakery was bought by newspaper columnist Wilson Lee Flores and the facilities underwent renovation for much of 2014. In October 2014, the bakery was awarded the Manuel L. Quezon Gawad Parangal Award by the Quezon City government under Herbert Bautista. In 2015, the Kamuning Bakery Café was opened.

The bakery building was hit by fire on early morning of February 6, 2018. Restoration works was done as the bakery reopens on December 24.

== Products ==
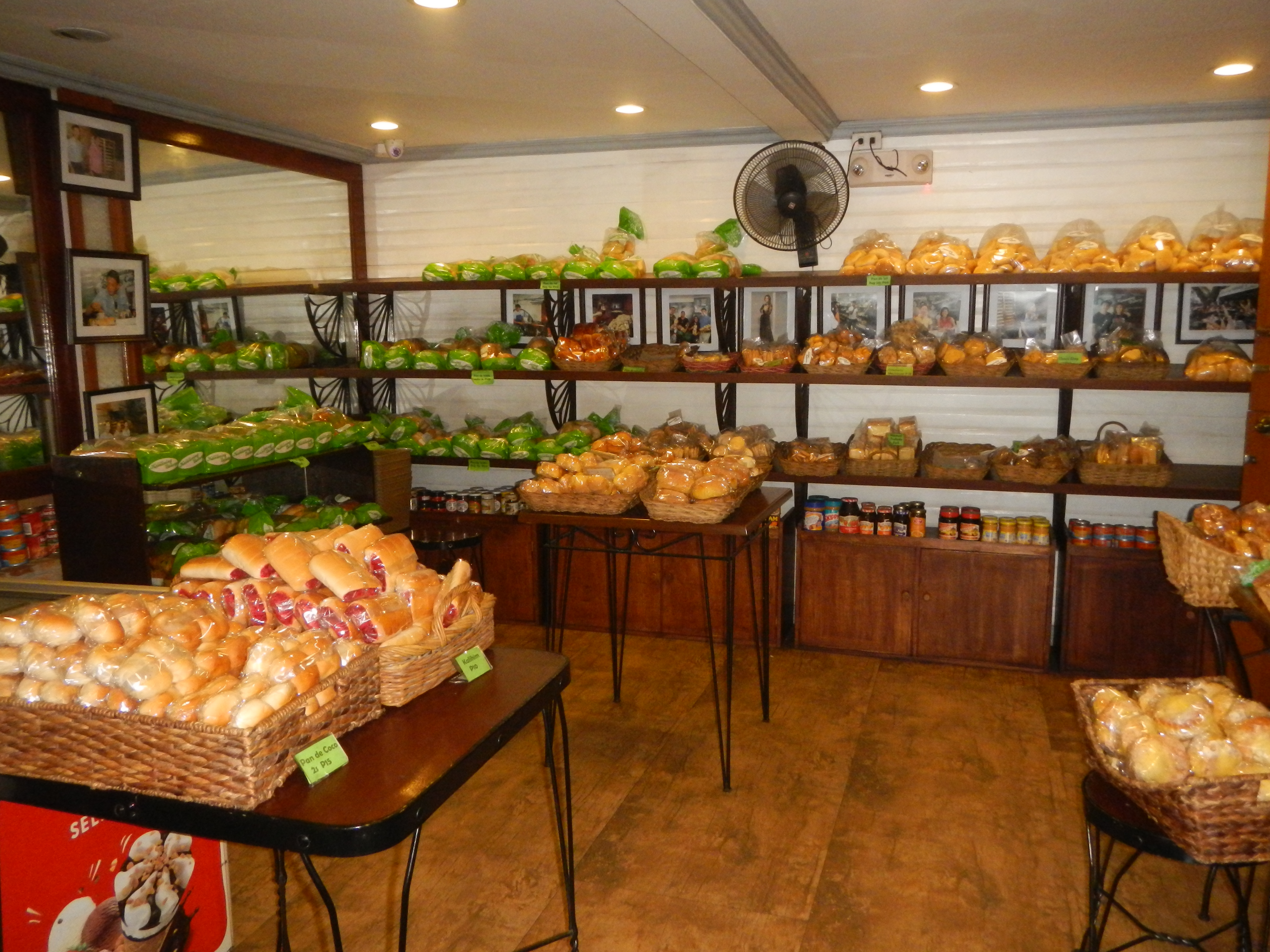
Baked goods sold in the bakery.

Kamuning Bakery is noted for baked goods prepared in its pugon or wood-fired brick oven, especially the pandesal and pan de suelo. The pugon used has been there since the bakery's inception in 1939. The pan de suelo is the bakery's flagship product, a bread which is cooked on the floor of the pugon rather than on top of pans.

When Flores took over the Bakery in 2013, the new management inherited 385 old recipes from the previous owners. Its cafe also serves coffee and bread-based dishes.

== Events ==
The Kamuning Bakery has been hosting the Pandesal Forum an event where journalists, politicians, and other public figures engage in dialougue since September 2015. Annually since 2015, the Kamuning Bakery observes the World Pandesal Day where it gives free bread to patrons every October 16.
