= Laura Lehmann =

Filipino actress, TV host, model, and beauty pageant titleholder

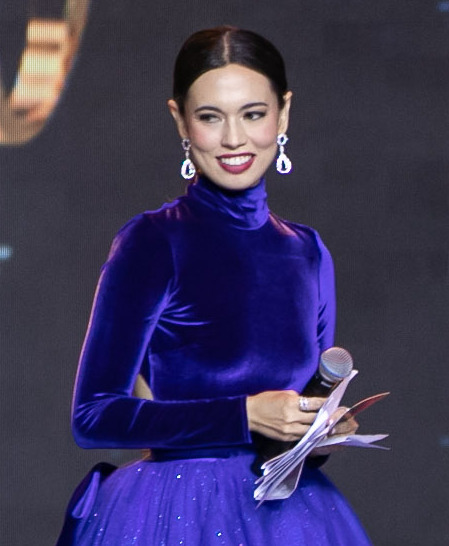
- Lehmann in 2022
- Born: Laura Victoria Lehmann; July 16, 1994 (age 32); Makati, Philippines
- Education: Ateneo de Manila University
- Height: 1.75 m (5 ft 9 in)
- Spouse: Von Pessumal (m. 2021)
- Children: 1
- Beauty pageant titleholder
- Title: Miss World Philippines 2017
- Hair color: Black
- Eye color: Brown
- Major competitions: Binibining Pilipinas 2014; (1st Runner-Up); Miss World Philippines 2017; (Winner); Miss World 2017; (Top 40)

Laura Victoria Lehmann-Pessumal (born July 16, 1994) is a Filipino television host, model, and beauty pageant titleholder who was crowned Miss World Philippines 2017. She represented the Philippines at the Miss World 2017 pageant in China and finished as a Top 40 semifinalist.

== Early life and education ==
Lehmann is of German, Swiss, Spanish, and Filipino descent and was raised by a single mother.

Lehmann attended Assumption College San Lorenzo and Beacon International School for grade school, before graduating high school from the International School Manila. She also attended Occidental College in Los Angeles, United States, before transferring to the Ateneo de Manila University to finish her studies, graduating with a Bachelor of Arts degree in psychology in 2014.

She was a member of the Philippines women's national softball team during her younger years and was supposed to play for the Ateneo before she decided to accept the scholarship offered to her by the Occidental College at the last minute.

== Career ==
Lehmann started her career as a courtside reporter in the UAAP Season 77 and 78 for the Ateneo Blue Eagles. She then went on to be a courstide reporter in the Shakey's V-League in 2015. In 2016, she became one of the hosts of the shows Upfront at the UAAP in ABS-CBN Sports and Action and Listed in Lifestyle.

In 2018, Lehmann transferred and signed a management contract with GMA Network.

In 2020, Lehman became one of the hosts of The Game, the flagship sports newscast of One Sports.

== Pageantry ==
=== Binibining Pilipinas 2014 ===
On March 30, 2014, Lehmann joined the Binibining Pilipinas 2014 pageant wherein she finished as the first runner-up.

=== Miss World Philippines 2017 ===
On September 3, 2017, Lehmann joined and won the Miss World Philippines 2017 pageant succeeding Catriona Gray.

On October 7, 2018, Lehmann crowned Katarina Rodriguez as her successor at the Miss World Philippines 2018 pageant held at the Mall of Asia Arena in Pasay, Philippines.

=== Miss World 2017 ===
Lehmann represented the Philippines at the Miss World 2017 pageant in Sanya, China, where she placed in the Top 40 and won the Beauty With A Purpose award.

== Personal life ==
Since 2014, Lehmann has been in a relationship with basketball player Von Pessumal. In May 2020, they announced their engagement after being together for five years. On May 23, 2021, she announced her marriage to Pessumal, which was solemnized in a civil ceremony earlier that year. Lehmann announced her pregnancy in January 2025. She gave birth to her first child, a daughter, in May 2025.

== Filmography ==
=== Film ===
Year	Title	Role	Notes	Ref.
2019	Elise	Rita	Film debut	
2019	The Annulment	Trisha		

Awards and achievements
Preceded by Catriona Gray (Albay)	Miss World Philippines; 2017	Succeeded by Katarina Rodriguez (Davao City)
Preceded by (Indonesia) Natasha Mannuela Halim	Beauty with a Purpose; 2017	Succeeded by (Nepal) Shrinkhala Khatiwada
Preceded by Pia Wurtzbach	Binibining Pilipinas (1st Runner-Up); 2014	Succeeded by Hannah Sison
