= Miss Island Philippines =

Filipino beauty pageant competition

- Type: Women Beauty Pageant
- Parent organization: ALV Pageant Circle
- Country represented: Philippines
- Qualifies for: Miss Global; Miss Asia Pacific International; Universal Woman; Face of Beauty International; Miss Tourism International; Miss Tourism Worldwide; Miss Tourism Queen of the Year International
- First edition: 2027
- Most recent edition: 2027
- President & CEO: Arnold L. Vegafria
- Language: Filipino; English

Miss Island Philippines is a Philippine beauty pageant that was announced in 2026 by ALV Pageant Circle, headed by pageant organizer Arnold Vegafria, with its inaugural edition planned for 2027. The name was first used for a national pageant held in 2008.

The planned 2027 pageant is expected to serve as a national selection platform for several international beauty pageants, including Miss Global, Miss Asia Pacific International, Universal Woman, Face of Beauty International, Miss Tourism International, Miss Tourism Worldwide, and Miss Tourism Queen of the Year International.

== Background ==
=== History ===
==== 2008 pageant ====
The first known Miss Island Philippines competition was held in 2008 at the SMX Convention Center in Pasay City. Karen May Manalo was crowned Miss Island Philippines – Tourism, while AJ Surjani won the Miss Island Philippines – Bikini of the World title.

Manalo was designated to represent the Philippines at the Miss Tourism International competition in Malaysia, while Surjani was slated to compete at Miss Bikini of the World in Venezuela.

==== 2026 relaunch ====
In August 2026, Arnold Vegafria announced plans to mount a new national beauty pageant under the name Miss Island Philippines. The announcement followed ALV Pageant Circle's loss of the Miss Grand Philippines franchise.

The inaugural edition is planned for 2027, with the coronation scheduled to be held at the Mall of Asia Arena in Pasay City.

=== Titles ===
Note that the year designates the time ALV Pageant Circle has acquired that particular pageant franchise.

Current titles
Membership under Miss Island Philippines	Year	Wins
Miss Global	2026 – Present	0
Miss Asia Pacific International	2025 – Present	0
Face of Beauty International	2024 – Present	2 (2024, 2025)
Miss Tourism International	2026 – Present	0
Miss Tourism Worldwide	2026 – Present	1 (2026)
Miss Tourism Queen of the Year International	2026 – Present	0
Membership under Miss World Philippines	Year	Wins
Miss World	2011 – Present	1 (2013)
Reina Hispanoamericana	2017 – Present	2 (2017, 2025)
Universal Woman	2024 – Present	1 (2024)
Miss Elite	2026 – Present	1 (2026)
Miss Interglobal	2026 – Present	1 (2026)
Miss Glamour Look International	2026 – Present	0
Former titles
Membership	Year	Wins
Miss Grand International	2023 – 2025	2 (2024, 2025)
Miss Supranational	2021 – 2022	0
Miss Eco International	2018 – 2023	2 (2018, 2022)
Miss Tourism World	2022	0
Miss Multinational	2017 – 2024	1 (2017)
Miss Environment International	2021	0
Miss Eco Teen International	2019 – 2022	1 (2020)
Miss Teen International	2026	0
Special title
Miss Tourism	2019 – 2024	

== Editions ==
Below is the complete list of Miss Island Philippines editions.

Year	Date	Presenters	Broadcasters	Entrants	Location
2027	TBA				

== Titleholders ==
Year	Current Titles							Ref.
Year	Miss Global Philippines	Miss Asia Pacific International Philippines	Universal Woman Philippines	Face of Beauty International Philippines	Miss Tourism International Philippines	Miss Tourism Worldwide Philippines	Miss Tourism Queen of the Year Philippines	Ref.
2027	TBA							

== Placements ==
=== Current titles ===
==== Miss Global ====
See Mutya ng Pilipinas and List of Mutya ng Pilipinas titleholders § Miss Global Philippines.

Year	Miss Global Philippines	Hometown	Placement	Special award(s)	Ref.
2026	Jayvee Lyn Loreto	Davao	3rd Runner-Up	2 Special Award: * Miss Global Asia and Oceania; Media Choice Award	

==== Miss Asia Pacific International ====
See Mutya ng Pilipinas and List of Mutya ng Pilipinas titleholders § Miss Asia Pacific International Philippines.

Year	Miss Asia Pacific Philippines	Hometown	Placement	Special award(s)	Ref.
2025	Anita Rose Gomez	Zambales	1st Runner-Up	13 Special Awards: Best in Swimsuit; Best in Evening Gown 1st Runner-Up; Best in National Costume 1st Runner-Up; Darling of the Press 1st Runner-Up; Miss Brainstrong; Miss Cindyrella Drip; Miss Hotel 101; Miss Pageanthology; Miss Pomp & Pageantry; Miss Mestiza; Miss Zen Intitute; RMBZ Café Min’s Choice; RMBZ Nutramin’s Choice	
2026	Gabrielle Galapia	Pampanga	3rd Runner-up	4 Special awards: * Best in Evening Gown; Best in Swimsuit; Darling of the Press; Miss JPark Island Resort and Waterpark	

==== Universal Woman ====
Year	Universal Woman Philippines	Hometown	Placement	Special award(s)	Ref.
2024	Maria Gigante	Cebu	Universal Woman 2024	4 Special awards: UW Social Media; UW Sympathy; UW MVLA; Fan Vote Winner	
2025	Jasmine Omay	Tarlac	Top 13		
2026	Marizza Delgado	New York	Unplaced	—	

==== Face of Beauty International ====
Year	Face of Beauty Philippines	Hometown	Placement	Special award(s)	Ref.
2024	Jeanne Isabelle Bilasano	Bicol Region	Face of Beauty International 2024	4 Special awards: Best in Evening Gown; Best in National Costume; Best in Swimwear; People’s Choice	
2025	Nikki Buenafe Cheveh	Quezon City	Face of Beauty International 2025	2 Special Awards: Best in Swimwear Top 3; TJCOS Award	
2026	Beatriz Angela Ocampo	Rizal	2nd Runner- Up	2 Special Award: * Best in National Costume; Best in Evening Gown	

==== Miss Tourism International ====
See Mutya ng Pilipinas and List of Mutya ng Pilipinas titleholders § Miss Tourism International Philippines.

Year	Miss Tourism International Philippines	Hometown	Placement	Special award(s)	Ref.
2026	Michelle Arceo	Taguig	TBA	TBA	

==== Miss Tourism Worldwide ====
Year	Miss Tourism Worldwide Philippines	Hometown	Placement	Special award(s)	Ref.
2026	Anne De Mesa	Manila	Miss Tourism Worldwide 2026	3 Special awards: Miss Celebrity; Best in Evening Gown; Best in National Costume	

==== Miss Tourism Queen of the Year International ====
Year	Miss Tourism Queen of the Year Philippines	Hometown	Placement	Special award(s)	Ref.
2026	Lorraine Ojimba	Rizal	TBA	TBA	

==== Reina Hispanoamericana ====
Year	Reina Hispanoamericana Filipinas	Hometown	Placement	Special award(s)	Ref.
2017	Teresita Ssen Marquez	Parañaque	Reina Hispanoamericana 2017	—	
2018	Alyssa Muhlach	Pasig	Unplaced	—	
2019	Maria Katrina Llegado	Taguig	5th Runner-Up	—	
2020	Pageant not held due to the COVID-19 pandemic				
2021	Emmanuelle Fabienne Camcam	Taguig	3rd Runner-Up	—	
2022	Maria Ingrid Teresita Santa Maria	Parañaque	Top 14	—	
2023	Michelle Arceo	Quezon City	2nd Runner-Up	—	
2024	Pageant not held				
2025	Deanna Marie Maté	Cavite	Reina Hispanoamericana 2025	1 Special award: Best Traditional Costume	
2026	Francesca Beatriz McLelland	Aklan	Top 13	—	

==== Miss Elite ====
Year	Miss Elite Philippines	Hometown	Placement	Special award(s)	Ref.
2026	Sophia Bianca Santos	Pampanga	Miss Elite 2026	1 Special award: Best in Evening Gown	

==== Miss Interglobal ====
Year	Miss Interglobal Philippines	Hometown	Placement	Special award(s)	Ref.
2026	Margarette Briton	Bicol	Miss Interglobal 2026	8 Special awards: Best in Evening Gown Top 5; Best in Fashion Top 5; Best in National Costume Top 5; Best in Talent Top 5; Dinner Dress Award; National Costume Excellence Award; Social Impact Award; Star Connect Award	

==== Miss Glamour Look International ====
Year	Miss Glamour Look Philippines	Hometown	Placement	Special award(s)	Ref.
2026	Erika Marie Davies	Taguig	TBA	TBA	

==== Miss World ====
See Miss World Philippines and List of Binibining Pilipinas titleholders § Miss World.

=== Former titles ===
==== Miss Teen International ====
Year	Miss Teen Philippines	Hometown	Placement	Special award(s)	Ref.
2025	Anna Margaret Mercado	Aglipay	Top 16	1 Special Award: Best in Evening Gown	
Miss Teen International Philippines acquired the franchise in 2026

==== Miss Grand International ====
See Miss Grand Philippines and List of Binibining Pilipinas titleholders § Miss Grand International Philippines.

Year	Miss Grand Philippines	Hometown	Placement	Special award(s)
2023	Nikki de Moura	Cagayan de Oro	Unplaced	—
2024	Christine Juliane Opiaza	Castillejos	Miss Grand International 2024^{[γ]}	—
2025	Emma Mary Tiglao	Pampanga	Miss Grand International 2025	1 Special award: Country’s Power of the Year
Reina Filipinas acquired the franchise in 2026

==== Miss Eco International ====
See The Miss Philippines and List of The Miss Philippines titleholders § Miss Eco International Philippines.

Year	Miss Eco Philippines	Hometown	Placement	Special award(s)	Ref.
2018	Cynthia Thomalla	Cebu	Miss Eco International 2018	3 Special awards: Top 10 Best in Resorts Wear; Top 15 Best in Eco Dress; Top 15 Best in Talent	
2019	Maureen Ann Montagne	Batangas	1st Runner-Up	1 Special award: 2nd Runner-up in Best in Resorts Wear	
2020	Pageant not held due to the COVID-19 pandemic				
2021	Kelley Day	Tarlac City	1st Runner-Up	1 Special award: Best in National Costume	
2022	Kathleen Paton	Aklan	Miss Eco International 2022	1 Special award: Best Eco Video	
2023	Ashley Montenegro	Makati	Top 21	—	
The Miss Philippines acquired the franchise in 2024

==== Miss Eco Teen International ====
See The Miss Philippines and List of The Miss Philippines titleholders § Miss Eco Teen International Philippines.

Year	Miss Eco Teen Philippines	Hometown	Placement	Special award(s)	Ref.
2019	Mary Daena Zaide Resurreccion	Manila	Top 5	—	
2020	Roberta Angela Tamondong	San Pablo	Miss Eco Teen 2020	4 Special awards: Best in Eco Dress; Best in National Costume; 1st Runner-Up in Beach Wear; 2nd Runner-Up in Best in Talent	
2021	Tatyana Alexi Austria	Parañaque	1st Runner-Up	2 Special awards: Miss Vatika; 1st Runner-Up in Eco Dress Prime	
2022	Francesca Beatriz McLelland	Aklan	1st Runner-Up	4 Special awards: Best in National Costume; Best in Resorts Wear; 2nd Runner-Up in Best Eco Dress; 2nd Runner-Up in Miss Talent	
2023	Francine Fatima Reyes	Tarlac	Top 11	—	
The Miss Philippines acquired the franchise in 2024

==== Miss Supranational ====
See The Miss Philippines and List of Binibining Pilipinas titleholders § Miss Supranational Philippines.

Year	Miss Supranational Philippines	Hometown	Placement	Special award(s)	Ref.
2021	Dindi Joy Pajares	Orani, Bataan	Top 12	—	
2022	Alison Black	Las Piñas	Top 24	1 Special award: Miss Talent	
The Miss Philippines acquired the franchise in 2023

==== Miss Tourism World ====
Year	Miss World Philippines Tourism	Hometown	Placement	Special award(s)	Ref.
2022	Justine Beatrice Felizarta	Marikina	1st Runner-Up	—	
Hiyas ng Pilipinas acquired the franchise in 2023

==== Miss Environment International ====
See Mutya ng Pilipinas and List of Mutya ng Pilipinas titleholders § Miss Environment International Philippines.

Year	Miss Environment Philippines	Hometown	Placement	Special award(s)	Ref.
2021	Michelle Arceo	Makati	1st Runner-Up	—	
Mutya ng Pilipinas acquired the franchise in 2022

==== Miss Multinational ====
Year	Miss Multinational Philippines	Hometown	Placement	Special award(s)	Ref.
2017	Sophia Señoron	Manila	Miss Multinational 2017	3 Special awards: Miss Environment; Miss Speech; Best in Interview	
2018	Kimilei Mugford	Ontario	Top 5	3 Special awards: Miss Multinational Asia; Best in Sports; Best in Talent	
2019	Isabelle de Leon	Quezon City	Pageant not held		
2021	Shaila Mae Rebortera	Cebu	Pageant not held		
2024	Nikki Buenafe Cheveh	Pangasinan	Pageant not held		

== See also ==
- Philippines at major beauty pageants
- Big Four beauty pageants
- List of beauty pageants
- Miss Universe Philippines
- Miss World Philippines
- Binibining Pilipinas
- Miss Philippines Earth
- Reina Filipinas
- The Miss Philippines
- Miss Island Philippines
- Mutya ng Pilipinas
- Miss Pearl of the Orient Philippines
- Miss Republic of the Philippines
