= Miss World Philippines 2026 =

13th Miss World Philippines pageant

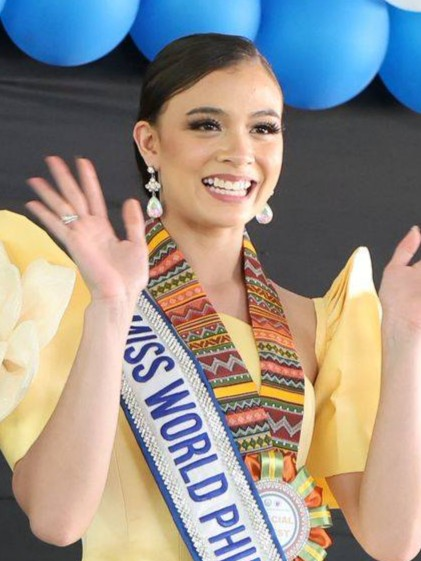
- Asia Rose Simpson
- Date: February 3, 2026
- Hosts: Leo Consul; Tracy Perez; Maria Gigante; Jasmine Omay
- Venue: SM Mall of Asia Arena, Pasay
- Broadcaster: TV5
- Entrants: 24
- Placements: 15
- Winner: Asia Rose Simpson; Quezon City
- Congeniality: Angel Abergas, Filipino Community of Singapore
- Best National Costume: Anne De Mesa, Manila
- Photogenic: Jayvee Lyn Lorejo, Davao Region

External videos
- Miss World Philippines 2026 Coronation Night

Miss World Philippines 2026 was the 13th edition of the Miss World Philippines pageant. It was held on February 3, 2026, at the SM Mall of Asia Arena in Pasay.

Krishnah Gravidez of Baguio crowned Asia Rose Simpson of Quezon City at the end of the event. Simpson represented the Philippines at Miss World 2026, where she reached the Top 12.

== Background ==
=== Location and date ===
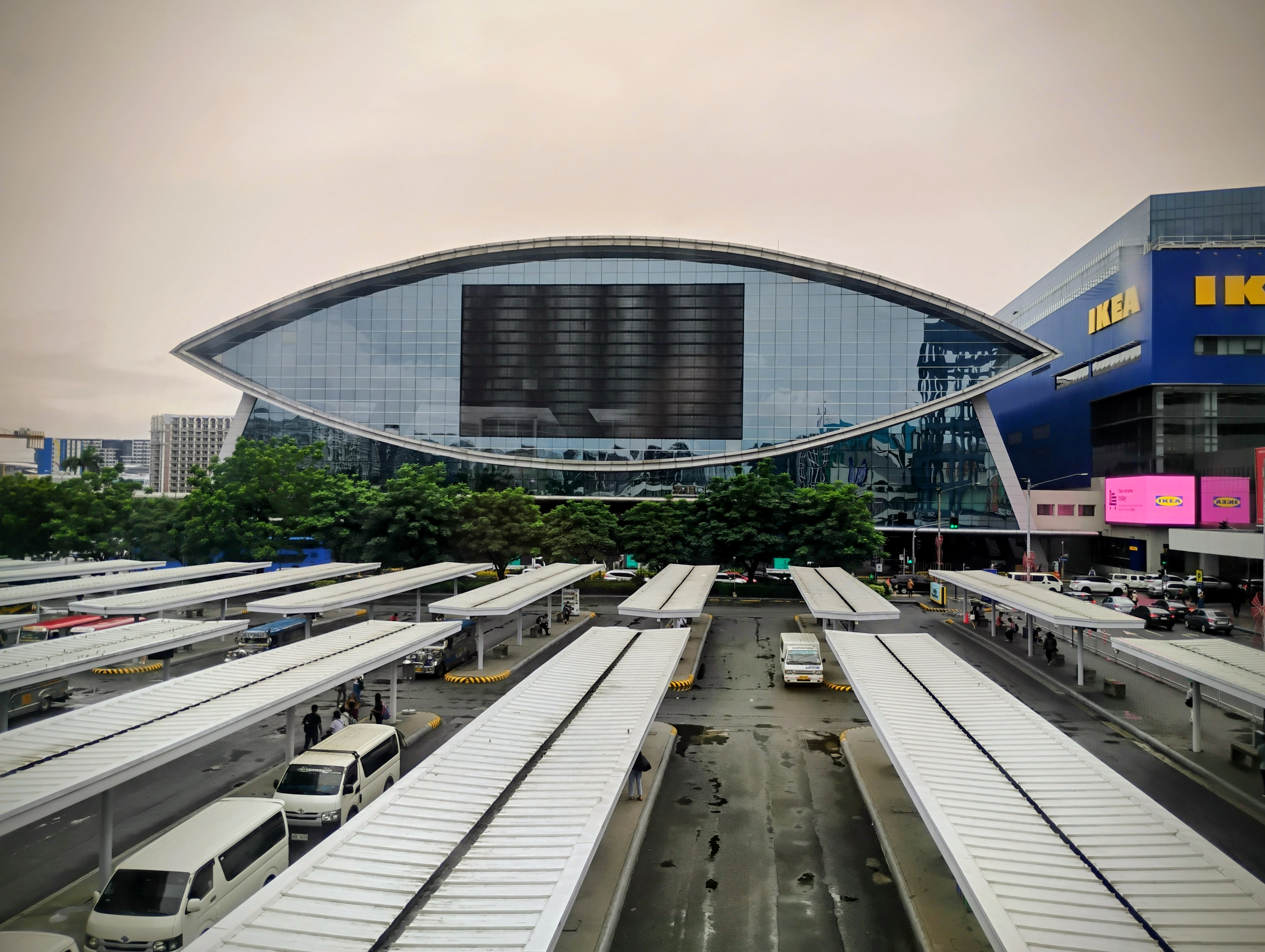
SM Mall of Asia Arena, the venue of the event

The Miss World Philippines Organization announced that the pageant will take place on February 3, 2026, at the SM Mall of Asia Arena in Pasay.

=== Selection of delegates ===
The organization announced the 24 entrants competing for the title at an event at the Okada Manila on January 16, 2026. National director Arnold Vegafria stated that the organization sought to recruit "new faces" from different provinces for the competition.

=== Titles contested ===
In addition to the main winner, who will be sent to Miss World 2026, the pageant will name delegates to other international beauty pageants: Miss Global, Miss Asia Pacific International, Universal Woman, Miss Tourism Worldwide, Miss Tourism Queen of the Year International, and Face of Beauty International.

== Results ==
=== Placements ===
==== Color keys ====
- The contestant won an international pageant.
- The contestant was a runner-up in an international pageant.
- The contestant was a semi-finalist in an international pageant.
- The contestant did not place.

=== Placements ===
Placement	Contestant	International Placement
Miss World Philippines 2026	Quezon City – Asia Rose Simpson	Top 12 – Miss World 2026
1st Princess	Manila – Anne De Mesa	
2nd Princess	Pampanga – Gabrielle Galapia	
Top 10	Batangas – Nicole Kristine Lorzano; Davao Region – Jayvee Lyn Lorejo; Filipino Community of New York – Marizza Delgado; Filipino Community of the United Kingdom – Margarethe Elize Romano; Ifugao – Valerie West; Rizal – Lorraine Ojimba; Sultan Kudarat – Olivia Grace Reilly	
Top 15	Bukidnon – Gwen Marie Perion; Iligan – Christal Briseis Polancos; Naga, Camarines Sur – Zoe Sofia Gabon; Negros Island Region – Cindy Agnes Valencia; Zamboanga City – Ansha Lichelle Jones	

=== Appointed titleholders ===
Title	Delegate	International Placement
Miss Global Philippines 2026	Davao Region – Jayvee Lyn Lorejo (assumed)	3rd Runner-Up – Miss Global 2026
Miss Global Philippines 2026	Ifugao – Valerie West (resigned)	Did not compete
Miss Asia Pacific International Philippines 2026	Pampanga – Gabrielle Galapia	3rd Runner-Up – Miss Asia Pacific International 2026
Universal Woman Philippines 2026	Filipino Community of New York – Marizza Delgado	Unplaced – Universal Woman 2026
Miss Tourism Worldwide Philippines 2026	Manila – Anne De Mesa	Winner – Miss Tourism Worldwide 2026
Miss Tourism Queen of the Year International Philippines 2026	Rizal – Lorraine Ojimba	TBD – Miss Tourism Queen of the Year International 2026
Miss Tourism International Philippines 2026	Davao Region – Jayvee Lyn Lorejo (promoted)	Did not compete
Miss Teen International Philippines 2026	Sultan Kudarat – Olivia Grace Reilly (resigned)	Did not compete

=== Special awards ===
==== Major awards ====
Award	Contestant
Best in Evening Gown	Filipino Community of New York – Marizza Delgado
Best in National Costume	Manila – Anne De Mesa
Best in Swimsuit	Ifugao – Valerie West; Quezon City – Asia Rose Simpson
Miss Congeniality	Filipino Community of Singapore – Angel Abergas
Miss Photogenic	Davao Region – Jayvee Lyn Lorejo

==== Sponsor awards ====
Award	Winner
Dr. Toledo Cosmetics Ambassador	Davao Region – Jayvee Lyn Lorejo; Filipino Community of New York – Marizza Delgado; Quezon City – Asia Rose Simpson
Face of Nova	Filipino Community of the United Kingdom – Margarethe Romano
Miss Bench	Davao Region – Jayvee Lyn Lorejo
Miss Bench Active	Ifugao – Valerie West
Miss Bench Body	Rizal – Lorraine Ojimba
Miss Chic Wellness	Ifugao – Valerie West
Miss GlutaLipo	Davao Region – Jayvee Lyn Lorejo
Miss Graze Yourself	Ifugao – Valerie West
Miss Hairfix	Davao Region – Jayvee Lyn Lorejo
Miss Hikari	Davao Region – Jayvee Lyn Lorejo; Ifugao – Valerie West; Pampanga – Gabrielle Galapia
Miss Honest Glow	Ifugao – Valerie West
Miss Hotel 101	Davao Region – Jayvee Lyn Lorejo
Miss JuanHand	Bukidnon – Gwen Perion
Miss Megan Beauty	Pampanga – Gabrielle Galapia
Miss Monarch Montage International	Ifugao – Valerie West
Miss Nook Salon	Ifugao – Valerie West
Miss NutriXpert	Ifugao – Valerie West
Miss Proshot	Ifugao – Valerie West
Miss SVS Salon	Davao Region – Jayvee Lyn Lorejo
Miss Tasty Fit	Davao Region – Jayvee Lyn Lorejo
MWell Health and Wellness Ambassador	Pampanga – Gabrielle Galapia
Toledo Med Ambassador	Davao Region – Jayvee Lyn Lorejo

== Pageant ==
=== Format ===
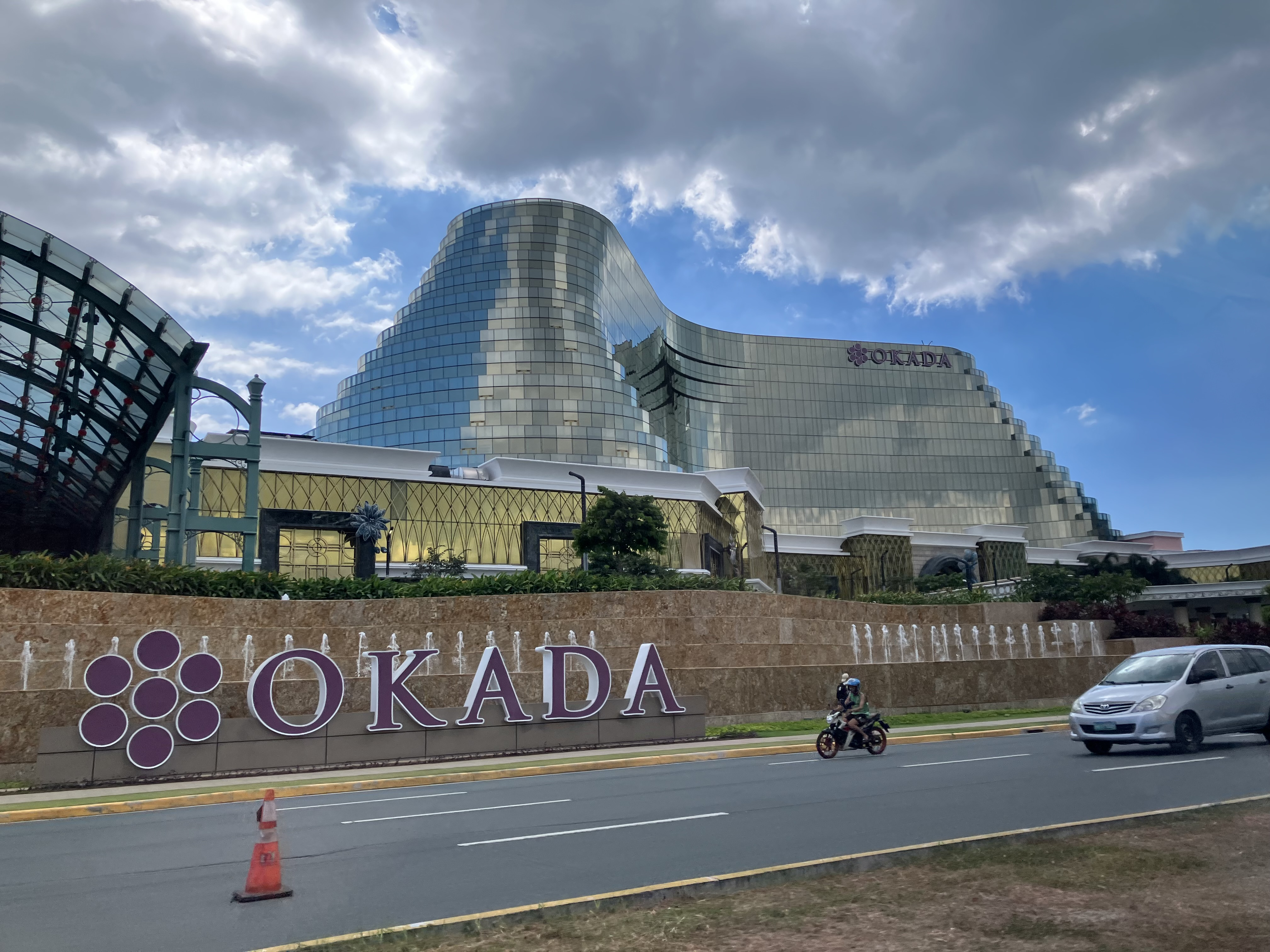
The gala night, held at the Okada Manila in Parañaque (pictured in 2024), served as the preliminary competition for the pageant.

The results of the Gala Night, held on January 29, 2026, at the Okada Manila in Parañaque, determined the first set of semi-finalists for the competition. Additional semi-finalists were named through the fast track events conducted leading up to the finale.

=== Broadcast ===
TV5 will serve as the broadcaster of the event on free television, accompanied by livestreams on Facebook and YouTube. Beauty queens Maria Gigante, Jasmine Omay, and Tracy Perez will serve as the presenters.

== Fast Track events ==
Leading up to the final round, a number of fast track events were held to pre-select semi-finalists.

=== Beauty with a Purpose ===
On January 20, 2026, the Beauty with a Purpose event took place at the Victoria Sports Tower in Quezon City. The eleven semi-finalists were announced on the same event. The winner who will be announced on February 3 will automatically have a spot in the semi-finals.

- Advanced to the Top 15 via Beauty with a Purpose.

Placement	Contestant	Ref
Winner	Quezon City – Asia Rose Simpson	
Top 11	Bukidnon – Gwen Marie Perion; Davao Region – Jayvee Lyn Lorejo; Filipino Community of New York – Marizza Delgado; Filipino Community of the United Kingdom – Margarethe Elize Romano; Ifugao – Valerie West; Iligan – Christal Briseis Polancos; Negros Island Region – Cindy Agnes Valencia; Oriental Mindoro – Ronette Castillo; Quezon – Kiana Rose Henson; Zamboanga Peninsula – Roveelaine Eve Castillo	

=== Dances of the Philippines Best in National Costume ===
On January 29, the candidates donned in cultural attire during the Dances of the Philippines segment which took place during the Miss World Philippines Charity Gala Night at the Grand Ballroom at the Okada Manila. The eight semi-finalists were announced on the same event. The winner will be announced on February 3.

- Advanced to the Top 15 via Dances of the Philippines Best in National Costume.

Placement	Contestant	Ref
Winner	Manila – Anne De Mesa	
Top 8	Davao Region – Jayvee Lyn Lorejo; Filipino Community of the United Kingdom – Margarethe Elize Romano; Ifugao – Valerie West; Negros Island Region – Cindy Agnes Valencia; Quezon City – Asia Rose Simpson; Rizal – Lorraine Ojimba; Zamboanga City – Ansha Lichelle Jones	

=== Head to Head Challenge ===
On January 21, 2026, the Head to Head Challenge were held at Southville International School and Colleges in Las Piñas. The top 8 were announced at the same event, with the final two being announced afterwards on January 22. The winner who will be announced will automatically have a spot in the semifinals.

- Advanced to the Top 15 via Head to Head Challenge.

Placement	Contestant	Ref
Winner	Pampanga – Gabrielle Galapia	
Runner-up	Ifugao – Valerie West	
Top 8	Davao Region – Jayvee Lyn Lorejo; Manila – Anne De Mesa; Naga City – Zoe Sofia Gabon; Quezon City – Asia Rose Simpson; Rizal – Lorraine Ojimba; Zamboanga City – Ansha Lichelle Jones	

=== Miss Charity ===
On January 29, the Miss World Philippines Charity Gala Night at the Grand Ballroom at the Okada Manila was held. The four semi-finalists for the Miss Charity title were announced on the same event. The winner will be announced on February 3.

- Advanced to the Top 15 via Miss Charity.

Placement	Contestant	Ref
Winner	Ifugao – Valerie West	
Top 4	Davao Region – Jayvee Lyn Lorejo; Filipino Community of the United Kingdom – Margarethe Elize Romano; Iligan – Christal Briseis Polancos	

=== Miss Multimedia ===
- Advanced to the Top 15 via Multimedia Challenge.

Placement	Contestant	Ref
Winner	Naga – Zoe Sofia Gabon	

=== Miss Talent ===
On January 29, the Talent competition took place during the Miss World Philippines Charity Gala Night at the Grand Ballroom at the Okada Manila. The six semi-finalists performed on the same event. The winner will be announced on February 3.

- Advanced to the Top 15 via Miss Talent.

Placement	Contestant	Ref
Winner	Quezon City – Asia Rose Simpson	
Top 6	Batangas – Nicole Kristine Lorzano; Ifugao – Valerie West; Laguna – Criszia Ainhize Arboleda; Occidental Mindoro – Meridith Bobadilla; Rizal – Lorraine Ojimba	

=== Online Voting ===
- Advanced to the Top 10 via Online Voting.

Placement	Contestant	Ref
Winner	Davao Region – Jayvee Lyn Lorejo	
1st Runner-up	Ifugao – Valerie West	
2nd Runner-up	Filipino Community of the United Kingdom – Margarethe Elize Romano	

=== Sports Challenge ===
- Advanced to the Top 15 via Sports Challenge.

Placement	Contestant	Ref
Winner	Ifugao – Valerie West	
Top 8	Bauan, Batangas – Carolyn Kean Tuquero; Bukidnon – Gwen Marie Perion; Filipino Community of Hawaii – Imani Ja'Asia Smith; Filipino Community of New York – Marizza Delgado; Manila – Anne De Mesa; Quezon City – Asia Rose Simpson; Rizal – Lorraine Ojimba	

=== Swimsuit Challenge ===
On January 29, the Bench Swimsuit event took place during the Miss World Philippines Charity Gala Night at the Grand Ballroom at the Okada Manila. The nine semi-finalists were announced on the same event. The winner will be announced on February 3.

- Advanced to the Top 15 via Swimsuit Challenge.

Placement	Contestant	Ref
Winner	Rizal – Lorraine Ojimba	
Top 9	Davao Region – Jayvee Lyn Lorejo; Filipino Community of New York – Marizza Delgado; Filipino Community of the United Kingdom – Margarethe Elize Romano; Ifugao – Valerie West; Iligan – Christal Briseis Polancos; Manila – Anne De Mesa; Quezon City – Asia Rose Simpson; Zamboanga City – Ansha Lichelle Jones	

=== Top Model Challenge ===
On January 29, the Top Model event took place during the Miss World Philippines Charity Gala Night at the Grand Ballroom at the Okada Manila. The nine semi-finalists were announced on the same event. The winner who will be announced on February 3 will automatically have a spot in the semi-finals.

- Advanced to the Top 15 via Top Model Challenge.

Placement	Contestant	Ref
Winner	Davao Region – Jayvee Lyn Lorejo	
Top 9	Filipino Community of New York – Marizza Delgado; Filipino Community of the United Kingdom – Margarethe Elize Romano; Ifugao – Valerie West; Iligan – Christal Briseis Polancos; Manila – Anne De Mesa; Pampanga – Gabrielle Galapia; Quezon City – Asia Rose Simpson; Rizal – Lorraine Ojimba	

== Contestants ==
The following contestants will be competing for the title:

Locality	Contestant	Age (Note: Ages at the time of the pageant)	Notes
Batangas	Nicole Kristine Lorzano	22	
Bauan, Batangas	Carolyn Kean Tuquero	23	
Bukidnon	Gwen Marie Perion	24	Competed at Miss Philippines Earth 2024
Davao Region	Jayvee Lyn Lorejo	24	
Filipino Community of Hawaii	Imani Ja'Asia Smith	—	Runner-up at Miss Universe Philippines Hawaii 2025
Filipino Community of New York	Marizza Delgado	26	Winner of Miss New York Earth USA 2022; Top 20 semi-finalist at Miss Earth USA 2022; Winner of Miss New York USA 2024; Top 20 semi-finalist at Miss USA 2024
Filipino Community of Singapore	Angel Abergas	27	
Filipino Community of the United Kingdom	Margarethe Elize Romano	—	Runner-up at Miss Universe Philippines United Kingdom 2024
Ifugao	Valerie West	22	Winner of Miss Universe Philippines New York 2025; Top 24 semi-finalist at Miss Universe Philippines 2025
Iligan	Christal Briseis Polancos	—	
Laguna	Criszia Ainhize Arboleda	—	
Manila	Anne De Mesa	26	Top 24 semi-finalist at Miss World Philippines 2021; Top 12 semi-finalist at Binibining Pilipinas 2022; Top 14 semi-finalist at Binibining Pilipinas 2025 Winner of Miss Tourism Worldwide 2026
Naga, Camarines Sur	Zoe Sofia Gabon	24	Winner of Miss Universe Philippines Virginia 2025; Competed at Miss Universe Philippines 2025
Negros Island Region	Cindy Agnes Valencia	—	
Occidental Mindoro	Meridith Bobadilla	18	
Oriental Mindoro	Ronette Castillo	24	
Pampanga	Gabrielle Galapia	26	
Quezon	Kiana Rose Henson	—	
Quezon City	Asia Rose Simpson	18	Competed at Miss Teen USA 2023 representing New Mexico
Rizal	Lorraine Ojimba	26	
Sultan Kudarat	Olivia Grace Reilly	18	
Valenzuela	Cherline Dalangin	18	
Zamboanga City	Ansha Lichelle Jones	19	Runner-Up at Miss Philippines Earth 2024
Zamboanga Peninsula	Roveelaine Eve Castillo	—	
