= Miss Philippines =

A number of beauty pageants may be known by variants of Miss Philippines, including:

- Miss Universe Philippines, a national beauty pageant that selects Philippines representative to Miss Universe.
- Miss World Philippines, a beauty pageant that selects Philippine representatives to Miss World, and to other international beauty pageants such as Reina Hispanoamericana, Miss Elite World, and Miss Interglobal.
- Miss Philippines Earth, a beauty pageant that selects Philippine representative to Miss Earth.
- Binibining Pilipinas, a beauty pageant that selects Philippine representatives to Miss International, and to other international beauty pageants such as The Miss Globe.
- The Miss Philippines, a beauty pageant that selects Philippine representatives to Miss Supranational, Miss Eco International, Miss Charm, Miss Cosmo, Miss Tourism World, Miss Eco Teen International, Miss Teen Universe, and Miss Worldwide.
- Reina Filipinas, a beauty pageant that selects Philippine representatives to Miss Grand International and MGI All Stars.
- Miss Island Philippines, a beauty pageant that selects the Philippine representatives to Miss Global, Miss Asia Pacific International, Universal Woman, Miss Tourism International, Miss Tourism Queen of the Year International, Face of Beauty International, Miss Tourism Worldwide, and Miss Glamour Look International.
- Mutya ng Pilipinas, a beauty pageant that selects the Philippine representatives to Miss Intercontinental, Miss Environment International, Top Model of the World, World Top Model, Miss Chinese World, Miss Global Universe and the inaugural Miss Mutya International.
- Miss Pearl of the Orient Philippines, a beauty pageant that selects Philippine representatives to Miss Aura International, Miss Orient Tourism Global, Miss Independent International, Miss Culture International, Miss City Tourism World, Miss Asia Global, and Miss Fitness Supermodel World.

== See also ==
- Philippines at the Big Four international beauty pageants
