= Binibining Pilipinas 2025 =

61st Binibining Pilipinas pageant

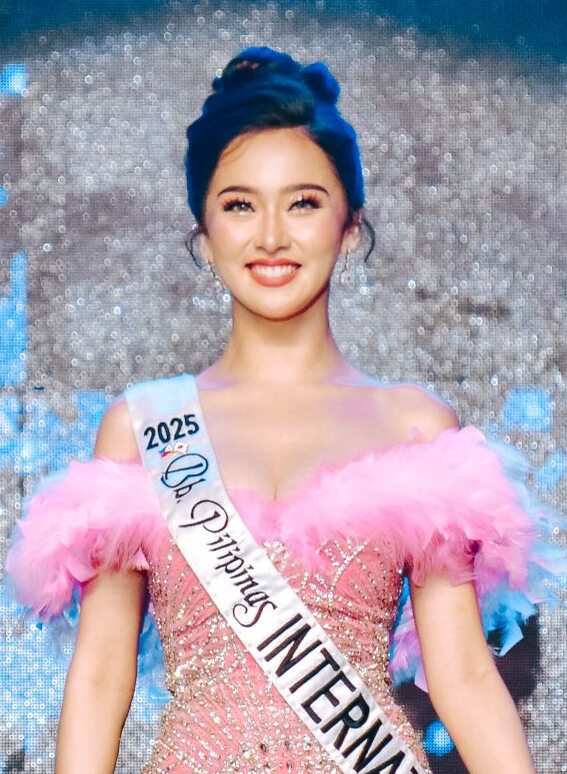
- Katrina Johnson
- Date: June 15, 2025
- Hosts: Kylie Verzosa; Maureen Montagne; Mary Jean Lastimosa; Nicole Cordoves
- Entertainment: SB19; Christi McGarry
- Venue: Smart Araneta Coliseum, Quezon City, Philippines
- Broadcaster: TV5
- Entrants: 36
- Placements: 14
- Withdrawals: San Mateo, Rizal
- Winner: Katrina Anne Johnson; Davao
- Congeniality: Cyril Reign Nulud; San Fernando
- Best National Costume: Blessie Jay Villablanca; Antique
- Photogenic: Francesca Beatriz Abalajon; Aklan

Binibining Pilipinas 2025 was the 61st edition of the Binibining Pilipinas pageant, held at the Smart Araneta Coliseum in Quezon City, Philippines, on June 15, 2025.

Myrna Esguerra of Abra crowned Katrina Anne Johnson of Davao as Binibining Pilipinas International 2025 and Jasmin Bungay of Pampanga crowned Annabelle Mae McDonnell of Iligan as Binibining Pilipinas Globe 2025 at the end of the event. Dalia Varde Khattab of Las Piñas was named first runner-up, while Kathleen Enid Espenido of Siargao was named second runner-up.

The competition was hosted by Kylie Verzosa, Mary Jean Lastimosa, Maureen Montagne, and Nicole Cordoves. P-pop group SB19 and Binibining Pilipinas Intercontinental 2015, Christi McGarry performed in this edition.

== Pageant ==
=== Selection of participants ===
On March 5, 2025, the organization launched its search for the next set of candidates who will represent the Philippines at different international pageants. The final submission of the application was on March 21, 2025. The final screening and selection of the thirty-six official contestants were conducted on April 4, 2025.

==== Disqualification ====
Binibini 13 Shereenia Mae Valerio representing San Mateo, Rizal, was disqualified due to "contract-related issues," as announced by the Binibining Pilipinas Charities Inc. (BPCI). Following her disqualification, Stella Tanglao Zacarias from Quezon City was appointed to replace Valerio.

=== Selection committee ===
The following served as members of Binibining Pilipinas 2025 board of judges:

- Conchitina Sevilla-Bernardo – Member of Binibining Pilipinas executive committee, chairman of the board of judges
- Francis Libiran – Fashion designer
- Alice Dixson – Actress and Binibining Pilipinas International 1986
- Huỳnh Thị Thanh Thủy – Miss International 2024 from Vietnam
- Diana Moreno – Miss Globe 2024 from Colombia
- Lala Sotto – Chairperson of Movie and Television Review and Classification Board
- Ralph Figueroa Delas Alas – CEO of Urban Smiles Dental Clinic

== Results ==
=== Placements ===
Legend

- National titleholder placed in the international pageant

| Placement | Contestant | International placement |
|---|---|---|
| Binibining Pilipinas International 2025 | Bb. #25 Davao – Katrina Anne Johnson | TBD – Miss International 2026 |
| Binibining Pilipinas Globe 2025 | Bb. #7 Iligan – Annabelle McDonnell | Top 11 – The Miss Globe 2025 |
| 1st Runner-Up | Bb. #36 Las Piñas – Dalia Varde Khattab | |
| 2nd Runner-Up | Bb. #18 Siargao – Kathleen Enid Espenido | |
| Top 14 | Bb. #3 Makati – Jercy Raine Cruz §; Bb. #4 Malabon – Mia Betina Golosino; Bb. #11 Rizal – Alyssa Mildred Villariña; Bb. #12 Aklan – Beatriz Mclelland; Bb. #19 Quezon – Maria Andrea Endicio; Bb. #22 Batangas – Anne De Mesa; Bb. #27 Mandaluyong – Jemille Justine Zosa; Bb. #28 Tarlac – Maria Alexandra Mata; Bb. #32 Pampanga – Joanne Marie Thornley; Bb. #33 Caloocan – Jerimi Nuqui | |

§ – Fan-vote winner from Playtime; dubbed as Playtime Binibini

=== Special awards ===
| Award | Contestant |
|---|---|
| Best in Evening Gown | Bb. #25 Davao – Katrina Anne Johnson |
| Bb. Dunkin | Bb. #25 Davao – Katrina Anne Johnson |
| Best in Swimsuit | Bb. #36 Las Piñas – Dalia Varde Khattab |
| Bb. Urban Smiles | Bb. #36 Las Piñas – Dalia Varde Khattab |
| Face of Binibini (Miss Photogenic) | Bb. #12 Aklan – Francesca Beatriz Abalajon |
| Bb. Friendship | Bb. #26 San Fernando – Cyril Reign Nulud |
| Best in National Costume | Bb. #30 Antique – Blessie Jay Villablanca |
| Bb. Philippine Airlines | Bb. #7 Iligan – Annabelle Mae McDonnell |
| Bb. Pizza Hut | Bb. #18 Siargao – Kathleen Enid Espenido |
| Playtime Binibini | Bb. #3 Makati – Jercy Raine Cruz |
| Manila Bulletin Readers' Choice | Bb. #11 Rizal – Alyssa Mildred Villariña |
| Playtime Digital Binibini | Bb. #22 Batangas – Anna Carres De Mesa |

== Contestants ==
Thirty-six contestants will compete for the two titles.

| No. | Locality | Contestant | Age | Notes |
|---|---|---|---|---|
| 1 | Batangas City | Jeanette Reyes | 26 | Won Miss Tourism Metropolitan International 2023 |
| 2 | Bulacan | Liiya Patricia Santiago | 25 | |
| 3 | Makati | Jercy Raine Cruz | 26 | Won Miss Chinatown Philippines 2023 |
| 4 | Malabon | Mia Betina Golosino | 19 | |
| 5 | Albay | Lois Vivien Garce | 22 | |
| 6 | Sariaya | Nichole Nash Andrea Vergara | 22 | Competed at Miss Aura Philippines 2022 |
| 7 | Iligan | Annabelle Mae McDonnell | 24 | First runner-up at Miss Charm 2023; First runner-up at Miss Universe Philippines 2022 |
| 8 | Tiaong | Andrea Clavel Sumadsad | 20 | |
| 9 | Pangasinan | Jenesse Viktoria Mejia | 24 | Top 10 finalist at Miss Grand Philippines 2024 |
| 10 | Antipolo | Kimberly Naz | 24 | |
| 11 | Rizal | Alyssa Mildred Villariña | 24 | Later Completed at Miss Philippines Earth 2026; Crowned Miss Philippines Water 2026 |
| 12 | Aklan | Francesca Beatriz Abalajon | 22 | First runner-up at Miss Eco Teen International 2022; Crowned Reina Hispanoamericana Filipinas 2025; Top 13 semi-finalist at Reina Hispanoamericana 2025 |
| 13 | Quezon City | Stella Tanglao Zacarias | 27 | |
| 14 | Zamboanga del Sur | Devine May Torres | 25 | |
| 15 | Pasig | Bianca Mae Hernandez | 25 | |
| 16 | Marikina | Alyssa Rae Zabala | 25 | Later competed at Miss Philippines Earth 2026; Runner-up at Miss Philippines Earth 2026 |
| 17 | Valenzuela | Vivian Vargas Hernandez | 25 | |
| 18 | Siargao | Kathleen Enid Espenido | 21 | Competed at Pinoy Big Brother: Kumunity Season 10 - Teen Edition |
| 19 | Quezon | Maria Andrea Endicio | 25 | Top 10 semi-finalist at Miss World Philippines 2024; Crowned as Mutya ng Pilipinas Tourism International 2025 |
| 20 | Samar | Farah Jane Rebustillo | 24 | |
| 21 | San Pablo | Pretty Shayne Arnejo | 26 | |
| 22 | Batangas | Anna Carres De Mesa | 26 | Top 24 semi-finalist at Miss World Philippines 2021; Top 12 semi-finalist at Binibining Pilipinas 2022; First Princess at Miss World Philippines 2026; Appointed as Miss Tourism Worldwide Philippines 2026; Crowned Miss Tourism Worldwide 2026 |
| 23 | Ilocos Sur | Joanna Francez Batalang | 23 | |
| 24 | Las Piñas (District 2) | Radha Marie Cabug | 19 | |
| 25 | Davao | Katrina Anne Johnson | 27 | First runner-up at Binibining Pilipinas 2023 |
| 26 | San Fernando | Cyril Reign Nulud | 24 | |
| 27 | Mandaluyong | Jemille Justine Zosa | 22 | Granddaughter of Binibining Pilipinas 1968 2nd runner-up Benigna Rustia |
| 28 | Tarlac | Maria Alexandra Mata | 22 | |
| 29 | South Cotabato | Glycelle Achurra Navarres | 27 | Competed at Miss Millennial Philippines 2019; Top 21 semifinalist at Mutya ng Pilipinas 2025 |
| 30 | Antique | Blessie Jay Villablanca | 25 | Competed at Miss World Philippines 2022 |
| 31 | Santo Tomas | Nica Dacanay | 23 | |
| 32 | Pampanga | Joanne Marie Thornley | 23 | Withdrew at Miss Universe Philippines 2024 |
| 33 | Caloocan | Jerimi Nuqui | 23 | |
| 34 | Bataan | Patricia Layug | 25 | |
| 35 | Nueva Ecija | Alyssa Marie Geronimo | 26 | Competed at Miss Grand Philippines 2024 |
| 36 | Las Piñas | Dalia Varde Khattab | 21 | A Star Magic Artist; Later Miss Cosmo Egypt 2026 |
