= Anne De Mesa =

Filipino model

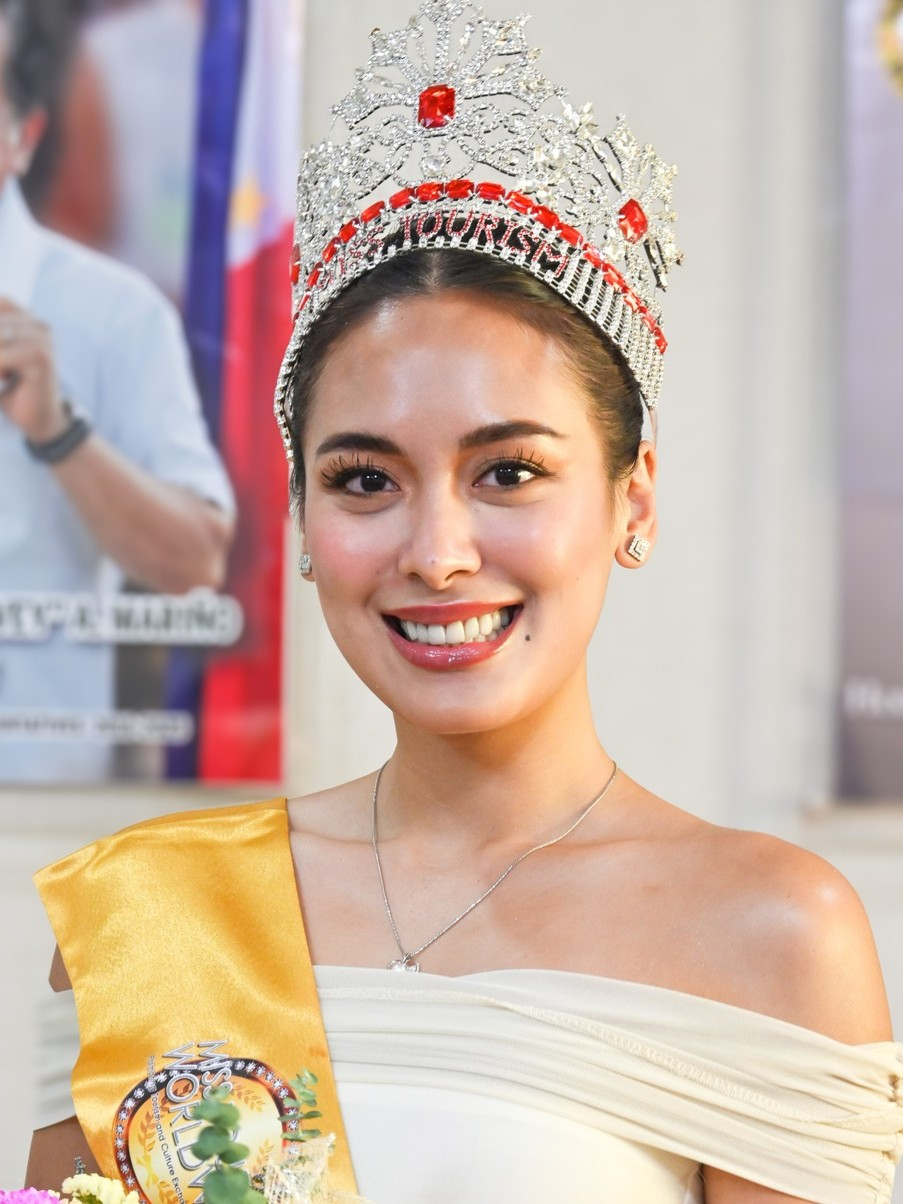
- De Mesa in 2026
- Born: Anna Carres Medina De Mesa; Batangas City, Philippines
- Education: University of Santo Tomas (BS)
- Height: 173 cm (68 in)
- Beauty pageant titleholder
- Title: Miss Tourism Worldwide Philippines 2026; Miss Tourism Worldwide 2026
- Major competitions: Miss World Philippines 2021; (Top 24); Binibining Pilipinas 2022; (Top 12); Binibining Pilipinas 2025; (Top 14); (Playtime Digital Binibini); Miss World Philippines 2026; (1st Princess); (Best National Costume); Miss Tourism Worldwide 2026; (Winner); (Miss Celebrity); (Best National Costume); (Best Evening Gown)

Anna Carres Medina De Mesa is a Filipino beauty pageant titleholder who was crowned Miss Tourism Worldwide 2026. She became the second Filipino winner after Zara Carbonell's victory in 2018.

De Mesa previously competed at Miss World Philippines 2021 representing Batangas City where she placed in the top 24. She then competed at Binibining Pilipinas 2022 and 2025 editions where she finished in the top 12 and 14 respectively. She then returned at the Miss World Philippines competition in 2026 representing Manila where she finished as the first princess.

== Early life ==
De Mesa was born in Batangas City. She graduated cum laude with a Bachelor of Science degree in accountancy from the University of Santo Tomas. She is a Certified Public Accountant (CPA) by profession, having passed the Professional Regulation Commission's licensure examination for CPAs in October 2019.

== Pageantry ==
=== Miss World Philippines 2021 ===
De Mesa made her pageantry debut at the Miss World Philippines 2021 competition representing Batangas City.

At the end of the event, she finished as a top 24 semifinalist. Tracy Perez of Cebu City won the title.

=== Binibining Pilipinas 2022 ===
De Mesa then competed the following year at the Binibining Pilipinas 2022 competition representing Batangas.

At the end of the event, she finished as a top 12 semifinalist. Nicole Borromeo of Cebu won the title.

=== Miss Manila 2023 ===
De Mesa then competed the following year at the Miss Manila 2023 competition representing Sta. Mesa.

At the end of the event, she was crowned Miss Manila Charity 2023. Gabrielle Lantzer of Malate won the title.

=== Binibining Pilipinas 2025 ===
De Mesa then returned to the 61st edition of the Binibining Pilipinas competition representing the Province of Batangas. During the competition, she was awarded the Playtime Digital Binibini special award.

At the end of the event, she finished as a top 14 semifinalist. Katrina Anne Johnson of Davao won the title.

=== Miss World Philippines 2026 ===
De Mesa then returned the following year to the Miss World Philippines 2026 competition representing Manila.

At the end of the event, she was crowned 1st Princess by Jasmine Omay. Asia Rose Simpson of Quezon City won the title.

=== Miss Tourism Worldwide 2026 ===
De Mesa was appointed by ALV Pageant Circle to represent the Philippines at the Miss Tourism Worldwide 2026 competition in Malaysia and Singapore after the local franchise was newly acquired by the organization. During the competition, she was awarded the Miss Celebrity special award.

At the end of the event, she was crowned as the winner by outgoing titleholder Joyce Tuijaerts of Benelux alongside being awarded special awards for Best in Evening Gown and National Costume. This marked the second time that the Philippines has won the title after Zara Carbonell in 2018.

Awards and achievements
Preceded by Allaine Nuez (Caloocan)	Miss Tourism Worldwide Philippines; 2026	Incumbent
