= Miss World Philippines 2022 =

11th Miss World Philippines pageant

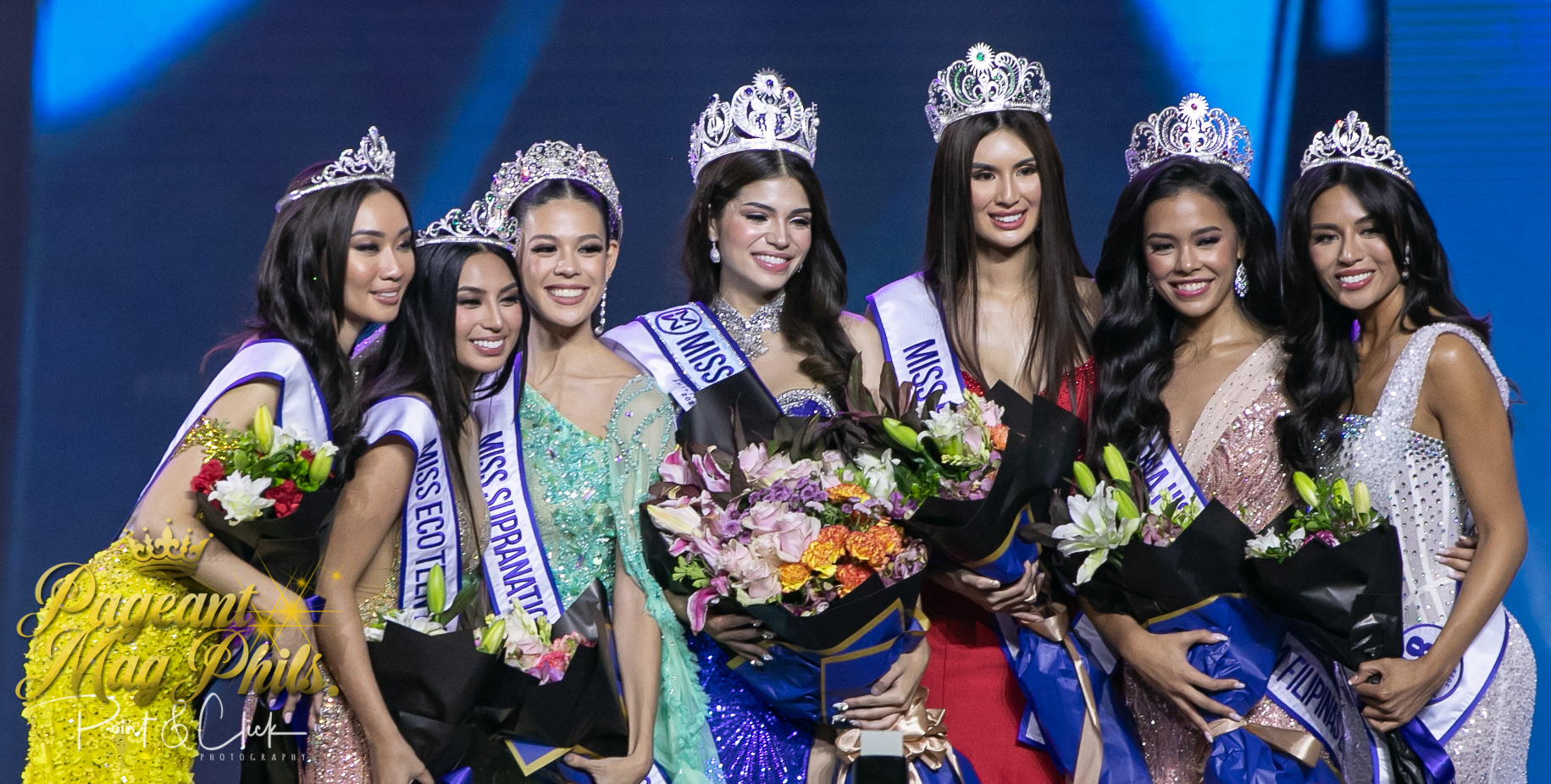
- Miss World Philippines 2022 and her court
- Date: June 5, 2022
- Presenters: Katarina Rodriguez; Laura Lehmann; Valerie Weigmann
- Entertainment: Adie
- Theme: Exceptionally Empowered Filipina
- Venue: SM Mall of Asia Arena, Pasay, Metro Manila, Philippines
- Broadcaster: KTX; CNN Philippines
- Entrants: 36
- Placements: 20
- Winner: Gwendolyne Fourniol; Negros Occidental
- Best National Costume: Justerinnie Santos, Bulakan
- Photogenic: Ashley Montenegro, Makati

Miss World Philippines 2022 was the eleventh Miss World Philippines pageant, held at the SM Mall of Asia Arena in Pasay, Metro Manila, Philippines, on June 5, 2022.

Tracy Maureen Perez of Cebu City crowned Gwendolyne Fourniol of Negros Occidental as her successor at the end of the event.

In this edition, five additional titleholders were also elected: Alison Black as Miss Supranational Philippines 2022, Ashley Montenegro as Miss Eco Philippines 2022, Ingrid Santamaria as Reina Hispanoamericana Filipinas 2022, Beatriz McLelland as Miss Eco Teen Philippines 2022, and Justine Felizarta as Miss Tourism World Philippines 2022.

== Results ==
=== Placements ===
==== Color keys ====
- The contestant won an international pageant.
- The contestant was a runner-up in an international pageant.
- The contestant was a semi-finalist in an international pageant.
- The contestant did not place.

Placement	Contestant	International Placement
Miss World Philippines 2022	#25 Negros Occidental – Gwendolyne Fourniol	Unplaced – Miss World 2023
Miss Supranational Philippines 2022	#24 Las Piñas – Alison Black	Top 24 – Miss Supranational 2022
Miss Eco Philippines 2022	#20 Makati – Ashley Montenegro	Top 21 – Miss Eco International 2023
Reina Hispanoamericana Filipinas 2022	#17 Parañaque – Ingrid Santamaria	Top 14 – Reina Hispanoamericana 2022
Miss Eco Teen Philippines 2022	#34 Aklan – Beatriz McLelland	1st Runner-Up – Miss Eco Teen International 2022
Miss World Philippines Tourism 2022	#18 Marikina – Justine Beatrice Felizarta	1st Runner-Up – Miss Tourism World 2022
Miss World Philippines Charity 2022	#22 San Juan – Cassandra Chan	
Top 11	#7 Carmona – Erika Kristensen; #9 Lipa – Kayla Adriane Tiongson; #13 Cebu – Maria Gigante; #21 Albay – Paula Ortega	
Top 20	#1 Marinduque – Simone Nadine Bornilla; #2 Roxas City – Erika Vinculado; #8 Iloilo – Tsina Jade Chu; #12 Quezon – Anje Mae Manipol; #23 Taguig – Charyzah Esparrago; #26 Bacoor – Aliana Joaquin; #31 Misamis Oriental – Natazha Vea Bautista; #35 Zambales – Patricia McGee; #36 Bulakan – Lady Justerinnie Santos	

=== Appointed titleholder ===
Title	Delegate	International Placement
Universal Woman Philippines 2024	Cebu – Maria Gigante	Winner – Universal Woman 2024

=== Special awards ===
Award	Contestant
Miss Photogenic	#20 Makati – Ashley Montenegro
Best in Swimsuit	#24 Las Piñas – Alison Black
Best in Evening Gown	#25 Negros Occidental – Gwendolyne Fourniol
Miss Le Meur Body	#20 Makati – Ashley Montenegro
Miss Kumu World	#10 Davao del Norte – Kristal Gante
Miss Silka	#25 Negros Occidental – Gwendolyne Fourniol
Non-Fungible Beauty Award	#13 Cebu – Maria Gigante; #17 Parañaque – Ingrid Santamaria; #24 Las Piñas – Alison Black
Love Your Skin Award	#18 Marikina – Justine Felizarta; #25 Negros Occidental – Gwendolyne Fourniol
Multimedia Awardees	#1 Marinduque – Simone Bornilla; #2 Roxas City – Erika Vinculado
Ambassador of Goodwill	#8 Iloilo – Tsina Jade Chu
Best in Creative Editorial and Fashion Photo	#13 Cebu – Maria Gigante; #22 San Juan – Cassandra Chan

== Events ==
=== Fast Track Events ===
Event	Winner	Finalists	Ref.
Sports Competition	#13 Cebu – Maria Gigante	#5 Batangas – Shaina Rose Ico; #22 San Juan – Cassandra Chan; #24 Las Piñas – Alison Black; #36 Bulakan – Lady Justerinnie Santos	
Beach Beauty	#25 Negros Occidental – Gwendolyne Fourniol	#13 Cebu – Maria Gigante; #17 Parañaque – Ingrid Santamaria; #18 Marikina – Justine Felizarta; #21 Albay – Paula Ortega; #22 San Juan – Cassandra Chan; #24 Las Piñas – Alison Black; #27 Iloilo City – Blessie Villablanca; #34 Aklan – Beatriz McLelland; #36 Bulakan – Lady Justerinnie Santos	
Talent	#22 San Juan – Cassandra Chan	#8 Iloilo – Tsina Jade Chu; #21 Albay – Paula Ortega; #24 Las Piñas – Alison Black; #25 Negros Occidental – Gwendolyne Fourniol	
Beauty With A Purpose	#12 Quezon – Anje Mae Manipol; #35 Zambales – Patricia McGee	#6 San Jose del Monte – Samantha Gabronino; #8 Iloilo – Tsina Jade Chu; #10 Davao del Norte – Kristal Marie Gante; #18 Marikina - Justine Felizarta; #21 Albay – Paula Ortega; #24 Las Piñas – Alison Black; #33 Pampanga – Marinel Tungol; #36 Bulakan – Lady Justerinnie Santos	
National Costume	#36 Bulakan – Lady Justerinnie Santos	#3 Lambunao – Angel Jed Latorre; #6 San Jose del Monte – Samantha Gabronino; #8 Iloilo – Tsina Jade Chu; #12 Quezon – Anje Mae Manipol; #17 Parañaque – Ingrid Santamaria; #18 Marikina - Justine Felizarta; #19 Balagtas – Kimberly Tiquestiques; #21 Albay – Paula Ortega; #25 Negros Occidental – Gwendolyne Fourniol; #31 Misamis Oriental – Natazha Vea Bautista	
Top Model	#17 Parañaque – Ingrid Santamaria; #20 Makati – Ashley Montenegro	#16 Manila - Carla Manuel; #21 Albay – Paula Ortega; #22 San Juan – Cassandra Chan; #24 Las Piñas – Alison Black; #25 Negros Occidental – Gwendolyne Fourniol; #26 Bacoor – Aliana Joaquin; #34 Aklan – Beatriz McLelland; #35 Zambales – Patricia McGee	

==== Head To Head Challenge ====
Placement	Contestant
Winner	#23 Taguig – Charyzah Esparrago
Finalist	#13 Cebu – Maria Gigante
Top 5	#7 Carmona – Erika Kristensen; #20 Makati – Ashley Montenegro; #30 Baliuag – Angela Teng
Top 13	#17 Parañaque – Ingrid Santamaria; #18 Marikina – Justine Felizarta; #21 Albay – Paula Ortega; #22 San Juan – Cassandra Chan; #24 Las Piñas – Alison Black; #25 Negros Occidental – Gwendolyne Fourniol; #27 Iloilo City – Blessie Villablanca; #34 Aklan – Beatriz McLelland

== Contestants ==
Thirty-six contestants competed for the four titles.

No.	City/Province	Contestant	Age
1	Marinduque	Simone Nadine Bornilla	19
2	Roxas City	Erika Vinculado	17
3	Lambunao	Angel Jed Latorre	16
4	Nueva Ecija	Maica Martinez	28
5	Batangas	Shaina Rose Ico	22
6	San Jose del Monte	Samantha Gabronino	22
7	Carmona	Erika Kristensen	25
8	Iloilo	Tsina Jade Chu	23
9	Lipa	Kayla Ariadne Tiongson	22
10	Davao del Norte	Kristal Marie Gante	22
11	Pangasinan	Maria Niña Soriano	26
12	Quezon	Anje Mae Manipol	25
13	Cebu	Maria Gigante	28
14	Angeles	Patricia Dizon	21
15	Pembo	Ivanna Kamil Pacis	26
16	Manila	Carla Manuel	24
17	Parañaque	Ingrid Santamaria	26
18	Marikina	Justine Beatrice Felizarta	28
19	Balagtas	Kimberly Tiquestiques	22
20	Makati	Ashley Montenegro	23
21	Albay	Paula Ortega	27
22	San Juan	Cassandra Chan	27
23	Taguig	Charyzah Esparrago	22
24	Las Piñas	Alison Black	23
25	Negros Occidental	Gwendolyne Fourniol	21
26	Bacoor	Aliana Joaquin	25
27	Iloilo City	Blessie Jay Villablanca	22
28	Bulacan	Marie Louise Long	19
29	Trece Martires	Loraine Arpia	23
30	Baliwag	Angela Teng	26
31	Misamis Oriental	Natazha Vea Bautista	20
32	Bataan	Kevyn Alessandrea Mateo	26
33	Pampanga	Marinel Tungol	27
34	Aklan	Francesca Beatriz McLelland	18
35	Zambales	Patricia McGee	17
36	Bulakan	Lady Justerinnie Santos	24
