= Jojo Bragais =

Filipino shoe designer and businessperson

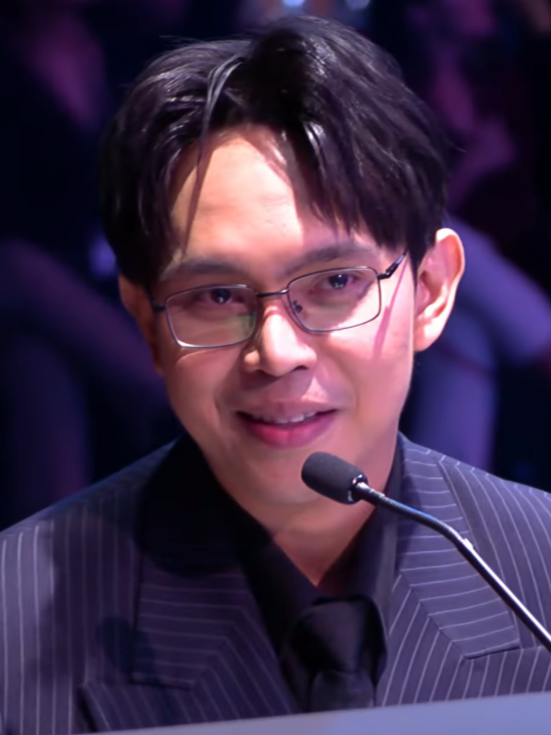
- Bragais in 2026
- Born: Jose Joaquin Albao Bragais; April 27; Albay, Bicol, Philippines
- Citizenship: Philippines
- Education: Bicol University (B.S.)
- Occupation: Businessman

Jose Joaquin "Jojo" Albao Bragais is a Filipino shoe designer and businessperson. He is the president and CEO of Jojo Bragais, a Filipino shoe brand known for pageant shoes.

== Personal life ==
Bragais was born and raised in Albay to Diomedes and Elsie Bragais. He is the youngest among four siblings. He graduated with a B.S. Nursing degree from Bicol University's Tabaco Campus in 2012. He is both a licensed midwife and nurse by profession.

In a way to combat depression after a break up, Bragais moved to Rizal from Albay to live with his aunt.

Bragais cited Filipino designers Michael Cinco and Rocky Gathercole as fashion icons he looks up to.

== Career ==
Bragais stumbled upon an old shoe factory in Binangonan, where he was offered to purchase the factory by the establishment's owner. He then purchased the factory using money given to him by his mother thinking that it would distract him from his depression. He then started the business, starting with a team of two people.

In 2014, Binibining Pilipinas 2014 candidate Yvethe Marie Santiago asked Bragais to craft her a pair of shoes for the pageant. This caught the attention of Stella Marquez Araneta, owner of Binibining Pilipinas who invited him to be the official footwear partner for the 2015 edition.

In 2018, Bragais became a part of Miss Universe 2018, Catriona Gray's team as a shoe designer where he was handpicked by Gray herself.

In 2024, Bragais became the first Filipino to be a part of the judging panel of the 2024 edition of the Miss USA competition.

In 2026, Bragais was revealed to join the panel of judges for the inaugural edition of MGI All Stars.

== Accolades ==
| Year | Event | Category | Recipient | Results |
|---|---|---|---|---|
| 2026 | Miss Grand International | Silver Grand Award | Reina Filipinas – Himself | Won |

== Filmography ==
=== Film ===
| Year | Title | Role | Notes | Ref. |
|---|---|---|---|---|
| 2021 | Beki Problems | Poging Online Seller | | |

==== As producer only ====
- Limited Edition (2021)

=== Television ===
| Year | Title | Role | Notes | Ref. |
|---|---|---|---|---|
| 2023 | Fit Check: Confessions of an Ukay Queen | Fashion Show VIP Guest, Entourage | 2 episodes | |
| 2022 | Rainbow Prince | Ryan | 2 episodes; The Escape, Heart of a King | |
| 2020 | Beki Problems: The Series | Poging Online Seller | 9 episodes | |
