= Gwendolyne Fourniol =

Filipino beauty pageant titleholder

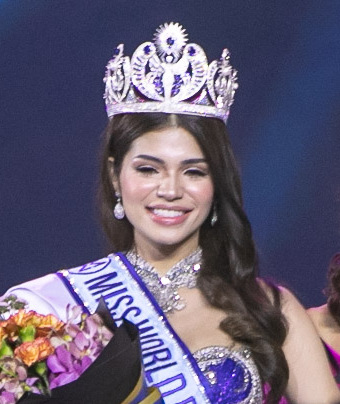
- Fourniol in 2022
- Born: Gwendolyne Bolivar Fourniol
- Education: Oxford Brookes University
- Beauty pageant titleholder
- Title: Miss World Philippines 2022
- Major competitions: Miss World Philippines 2021; (Top 15); Miss World Philippines 2022; (Winner); Miss World 2023; (Unplaced)

Gwendolyne Bolivar Fourniol (Tagalog pronunciation: [bɔliˈbɐɾ pɔɾˈɲɔl]; French pronunciation: [fuʁɲɔl]) is a Filipina beauty pageant titleholder won Miss World Philippines 2022. She represented the Philippines at Miss World 2023 in India, and was unplaced.

== Early life and education ==
Gwendolyne Bolivar Fourniol was born to a Filipina mother, Sim Fourniol (née Bolivar), from Himamaylan, Negros Occidental, and a French father, Thierry Fourniol. She was raised in the Philippines and France, and now lives in Negros Occidental, Western Visayas, Philippines. Fourniol is currently completing her bachelor's degree in economics at the Oxford Brookes University in London, England.

== Pageantry ==
Fourniol competed in Miss World Philippines 2021 and finished in the top 15. Fourniol won Miss World Philippines 2022. She also received the Best in Evening Gown, Love Your Skin, and Miss Silka awards. Fourniol represented the Philippines at Miss World 2023, on March 9, 2024 in India but was unplaced. Krystyna Pyszková of the Czech Republic won the pageant.

Preceded by Tracy Perez (Cebu City)	Miss World Philippines; 2022	Succeeded by Krishnah Gravidez (Baguio)
