= Miss Pearl of the Orient Philippines =

Filipino beauty pageant competition

- Type: Women Beauty Pageant
- Parent organization: Oriental Beauty Philippines Charities Inc.
- Headquarters: San Roque, Cardona, Rizal
- Country represented: Philippines
- Qualifies for: Miss Aura International; Miss Orient Tourism Global; Miss Independent International; Miss Tourism World; Miss Asia Global; Miss Supermodel World; Miss City Tourism Global; Miss Terra Bella World
- First edition: 2024
- Most recent edition: 2026
- Current titleholder: Lanelle Aira Cajucom; Nueva Ecija
- President & CEO: Makoy Manlapaz
- Charity Events Director: JM Robles
- Language: Filipino; English

Miss Pearl of the Orient Philippines (MPOP) is a national beauty pageant in the Philippines that celebrates Filipino culture, empowers women, and promotes tourism. Established in 2024, the pageant serves as a platform for Filipina women to showcase their beauty, intelligence, and advocacy for social, environmental, and cultural issues. The name of the pageant draws inspiration from the historic moniker for the Philippines—"Pearl of the Orient."

== History ==
Miss Pearl of the Orient Philippines was officially launched in 2024 with the vision of providing a platform for Filipina women to represent the values and culture of the Filipino people through pageantry and charity initiatives. It gained attention for its regional representation and inclusivity, aiming to highlight the diversity of the archipelago.

=== Deeply Filipino ===
All segments, scripts, and even pageant programs are in Tagalog (with some Taglish), emphasizing native language and culture

=== Cultural showcase ===
In 2024 Contestants highlight local traditions—from regional costumes to activities like “Sikaran” (a Rizal-based martial art)—to celebrate the diversity of the archipelago.

== Mission, Vision, Objective ==
=== Mission ===
The mission of Miss Pearl of the Orient Philippines is to empower young Filipino women through leadership and community service. The pageant will facilitate a platform for Filipinos to better understand and appreciate the Philippine culture, traditions and values through a National Pageant. As candidates and winners of the pageant, they will work to affect positive change through volunteering, fundraising and advocacy. During their reign, the winners will be given the tools to personally and professionally enrich others by dedicating themselves to raising awareness and much needed funds for philanthropic endeavors.

=== Vision ===
The vision of Miss Pearl of the Orient Philippines is to embody the legacy of the Filipinos with emphasis on preserving the beautiful culture, heritage and values of the country and to work diligently to leave a positive impact to the community.

=== Objective ===
The objective of Miss Pearl of the Orient Philippines is to promote culture, traditions and values of the Philippines. The Pageant campaigns to help those who are in need especially the children with educational, medical and other basic needs. The pageant also aims to promote the Filipino women with emphasis on intelligence, heart to serve, societal awareness and self-confidence.

== Format ==
Candidates are selected through local pageants held across various provinces and cities. The winners represent their localities at the national pageant. The competition typically includes:

- Preliminary interviews
- Swimsuit, National Costume and Evening gown segments
- Cultural and advocacy presentations
- Final Q&A and coronation

== Titles ==
Current Franchise
Titles	Year
Miss Aura International	2024 — Present
Miss Orient Tourism Global	2024 — Present
Miss Independent International	2024 — Present
Miss Tourism World	2025 – Present
Miss Culture International	2026 — Present
Miss City Tourism World	2026 — Present
Miss Asia Global	2026 — Present
Miss Fitness Supermodel World	2026 — Present
Miss Terra Bella World	2026 — Present
Past Franchise
Titles	Year
Miss Heritage International	2024
Miss Business Global	2025 — 2026
Miss Celebrity International	2025 — 2026

== Editions ==
The following is a list of national titleholders:

Year	Miss Pearl of the Orient Philippines	Culture Ambassador	Heritage Ambassador	Charity Ambassador	1st Runner-up	2nd Runner-up	3rd Runner-up	4th Runner-up	Miss Pearl of the Orient Luzon	Miss Pearl of the Orient Visayas	Miss Pearl of the Orient Mindanao	Entrants	Venue	Date
2024	Krishan Pauline Alerre Pampanga	Hannah Marie Alejandro Antipolo City	Patricia Anne Nicole Bangug Pangasinan	Not Awarded	Cayenei Cortez Tarlac	Wesmin Pacalso Nueva Vizcaya	Not Awarded	Not Awarded	Not Awarded	Not Awarded	Not Awarded	14	Tanghalang Pasigueño, Pasig City, Metro Manila	July 27, 2024
2025	Mariel Baltazar District 4, Quezon City	Leanna Kylee Manuel Tarlac	Chariesse Anthea Abanico Lipa City	Mariel Baltazar District 4, Quezon City	Abigail Nichole Florendo Taytay, Rizal	Jhan Nicole Ambata Dasmariñas City	Jasmine Chloe Arciga District 1, Quezon City	Ashley Jane Francisco Isabela	Not Awarded	Not Awarded	Not Awarded	27	Bulwagang Kanlahi, Tarlac City, Tarlac	August 3, 2025
2026	Lanelle Aira Cajucom Nueva Ecija	Shaina Anne Soliven United Kingdom	Jessica Mae Gatungay Iloilo	Mary Queen Decolongon Taguig City	Marie Alma dela Cruz Tarlac	Chrystine Nikolett Montero Quirino	Not Awarded	Not Awarded	Hanna Crissa Galulu Tarlac City	Julea Allynae Tangapa Siquijor	Louise Jerianne Rodaje Santa Josefa, Agusan del Sur	22	Robert B. Estrella Sr. Memorial Stadium, Rosales, Pangasinan	August 14, 2026

== Placements in international pageants ==
The following are the placements of Miss Pearl of the Orient Philippines titleholders in international pageants.

=== Current titles ===
==== Miss Aura International ====
See The Miss Philippines and List of The Miss Philippines titleholders § Miss Aura International Philippines.

Year	Official delegate	Represented	Competition performance		Ref.
Year	Official delegate	Represented	Placement	Other award(s)	Ref.
2025	Krishan Pauline Alerre	Pampanga	Miss Aura International 2025	Top 15 Best in Evening Gown	
2026	Mariel Baltazar	District 4, Quezon City	Top 11	Miss Peace Ambassador	

==== Miss Orient Tourism Global ====
Year	Official delegate	Represented	Competition performance		Ref.
Year	Official delegate	Represented	Placement	Other award(s)	Ref.
2025	Patricia Anne Nicole Bangug	Pangasinan	Miss Orient Tourism Global 2025	Best in National Costume; Miss Personality	
2026	Marie Alma dela Cruz	Tarlac	4th Runner-up	Best in National Costume; Best in Evening Gown; 1st Runner-up Miss Popularity	

==== Miss Independent International ====
Year	Official delegate	Represented	Competition performance		Ref.
Year	Official delegate	Represented	Placement	Other award(s)	Ref.
2025	Wesmin Pacalso	Nueva Vizcaya	Miss Independent International 2025	Best in Evening Gown; Best in National Costume	
2026	Chariesse Anthea Abanico	Lipa City	1st Runner-up	Miss Photogenic; Best Catwalk	

==== Miss Tourism World ====
See Miss Island Philippines and List of Miss Island Philippines titleholders § Miss Tourism World Philippines.

Year	Official delegate	Represented	Competition performance		Ref.
Year	Official delegate	Represented	Placement	Other award(s)	Ref.
2025	Ashley Jane Francisco	Isabela	Unplaced		
in partnership with The Miss Philippines
2026	Marian Arellano	Tarlac	TBD	TBD	

==== Miss Culture International ====
Year	Official delegate	Represented	Competition performance		Ref.
Year	Official delegate	Represented	Placement	Other award(s)	Ref.
2026	Leanna Kaylee Manuel	Tarlac	1st Runner-up	Best in Sports Wear	

==== Miss Asia Global ====
Year	Official delegate	Represented	Competition performance		Ref.
Year	Official delegate	Represented	Placement	Other award(s)	Ref.
2026	Lanelle Aira Cajucom	Nueva Ecija	Top 10	Miss Beauty with a Mission; 2nd Runner-up Best in Evening Gown	

==== Miss City Tourism World ====
Year	Official delegate	Represented	Competition performance		Ref.
Year	Official delegate	Represented	Placement	Other award(s)	Ref.
2026	Julea Allynae Tangapa	Siquijor	TBA	TBA	

==== Miss Fitness Supermodel World ====
Year	Official delegate	Represented	Competition performance		Ref.
Year	Official delegate	Represented	Placement	Other award(s)	Ref.
2026	Stephanie Ann Elmission	Dasol, Pangasinan	4th Runner-up		

==== Miss Terra Bella World ====
Year	Official delegate	Represented	Competition performance		Ref.
Year	Official delegate	Represented	Placement	Other award(s)	Ref.
2026	Jessica Mae Gatungay	Iloilo	TBD	TBD	

=== Past titles ===
==== Miss Heritage International ====
Year	Official delegate	Represented	Competition performance		Ref.
Year	Official delegate	Represented	Placement	Other award(s)	Ref.
2024	Cayenei Cortez	Tarlac	1st Runner-up	Best in Evening Gown; Miss Confident	

==== Miss Business Global ====
Year	Official delegate	Represented	Competition performance		Ref.
Year	Official delegate	Represented	Placement	Other award(s)	Ref.
2025	Hannah Marie Alejandro	Antipolo City	2nd Runner-up	Best in National Costume; Miss Business Global - Inspiration	

==== Miss Celebrity International ====
Year	Official delegate	Represented	Competition performance		Ref.
Year	Official delegate	Represented	Placement	Other award(s)	Ref.
2025	Abigail Nichole Florendo	Taytay, Rizal	Did Not Compete		
2025	Alessandra David	Tarlac	2nd Runner-up	Best in National Costume	

== Advocacy and Projects ==
Titleholders and runners-up engage in environmental, educational, and health advocacy programs in collaboration with local government units and NGOs. The organization supports tourism through cultural and charitable initiatives.

=== Project ISLA ===
Miss Pearl of the Orient Philippines (MPOP) through Oriental Beauty Philippines Charities Inc. (OBPCI), a charitable initiative supporting children in island communities across the Philippines. Its activities include school-supply donations, feeding programs, and participation in the annual Brigada Eskwela. The name "ISLA" is an acronym for "Inspire, Support, Learn and Achieve."

== See also ==
- Philippines at major beauty pageants
- Big Four beauty pageants
- List of beauty pageants
- Miss Universe Philippines
- Miss World Philippines
- Binibining Pilipinas
- Miss Philippines Earth
- Reina Filipinas
- The Miss Philippines
- Miss Island Philippines
- Mutya ng Pilipinas
- Miss Pearl of the Orient Philippines
- Miss Republic of the Philippines
