= Asia Rose Simpson =

Filipino beauty pageant titleholder and dancer (born 2007 or 2008)

- Simpson in 2026
- Born: Asia Rose Simpson; 2007 or 2008 (age 18–19); Hobbs, New Mexico, U.S.
- Occupation: Beauty queen
- Beauty pageant titleholder
- Title: Miss World Philippines 2026
- Major competitions: Miss Teen USA 2023 (Unplaced; Miss Congeniality); Miss World Philippines 2026 (Winner; Beauty With a Purpose); Miss World 2026 (Top 12) (Head-To-Head Challenge Winner)

Asia Rose Simpson (born 2007 or 2008) is a Filipino beauty pageant titleholder and dancer who won Miss World Philippines 2026. Winning the title at age 18, she is the youngest entrant to win the pageant. She represented the Philippines at Miss World 2026, where she placed in the Top 12.

Simpson previously participated in the fifth season of Pilipinas Got Talent (2016) as part of her family's acrobatics act. In 2023, she won Miss New Mexico Teen USA, which allowed her to compete in Miss Teen USA 2023, where she won Miss Congeniality.

== Early life and career ==
Simpson was born in 2007 or 2008 in Hobbs, New Mexico, United States, to a family of dancers and Christian missionaries. Her father is Joseph Simpson, a Filipino, and her mother is Brittany Banks, an American. As missionaries, her family traveled frequently early in her life. She arrived in the Philippines at six months old in Roxas City, Capiz, where she was raised. Her family would later settle in Manila and then Quezon City.

Simpson was homeschooled. At the age of three, her father began to teach her how to dance. In 2016, she appeared on the fifth season of Pilipinas Got Talent with her father and siblings as part of the acrobatics act The Simpson Tribe, which qualified for the judges' cull but did not advance further. Her family founded the SED initiative, which aims to achieve mental wellness through sports and dance. As of 2026, their program has reached 7,000 individuals.

== Pageantry ==
=== Miss Teen USA 2023 ===
Representing her native Hobbs, Simpson won Miss New Mexico Teen USA 2023, allowing her to compete at Miss Teen USA 2023. At the national pageant, she won the Miss Congeniality award but did not advance to the semifinals. The winner was UmaSofia Srivastava of New Jersey, who later resigned.

=== Miss World Philippines 2026 ===
On April 6, 2025, Simpson won the local Quezon City pageant for Miss World Philippines 2026, allowing her to represent the locality at the national contest. Competing at age 18, she was the youngest entrant for that edition. Leading up to the competition, Simpson became a semi-finalist for seven of the ten fast-track challenges and won two—Beauty With a Purpose and Miss Talent—which allowed her to advance to the finals.

At the finals night, she was named Best in Swimsuit, together with Valerie West of Ifugao. She progressed to the final question-and-answer round where she was asked if social media has either helped or hurt society. In her answer, she highlighted mental health and cited data from the World Health Organization about the rise in sedentary behavior among youth in explaining the importance of her initiative. She acknowledged the benefits of social media encouraged responsibility with its use.

At the end of the event, she was announced as the winner, being crowned by her predecessor, Krishnah Gravidez of Baguio, becoming the youngest titleholder in the pageant's history.

=== Miss World 2026 ===
Simpson represented the Philippines at Miss World 2026, competing under the continental group of Asia and Oceania. Her Beauty With a Purpose presentation for the competition advocated for physical activity as a means of improving "physical, mental, and emotional health" and connecting with others. Meanwhile, her entry for the talent competition was a dance number titled "Succor", which narrated a story about mental health. Ryan Ablaza Uson designed her gown for the finals titled "The Lotus Flower".

Simpson was a finalist for five fast-track challenges: sports, head-to-head, top model, talent, and Beauty With a Purpose. She secured a placement in the top 40 after being named as a continental winner in the head-to-head challenge. She also finished third in the talent portion.

During the finals, she directly advanced to the top 20 after being named the overall winner for the head-to-head challenge. She progressed to the Top 12 question-and-answer round soon after. For the segment, she was asked to share something about her region she wanted the world to understand and how it can be applied as Miss World. In her response, she selected unity, which she described as the "core component of the family" as a value she would share to the world.

She was eliminated after the round, finishing second in her continental group and among the Top 12 overall. Joheirry Mola of the Dominican Republic won the competition.

== Personal life ==
Simpson works as a dance mentor and plays pickleball.

== Filmography ==
=== Television ===
Year	Title	Role	Notes	Ref.
2016	Pilipinas Got Talent season 5	Contestant (as part of The Simpson Tribe)	Eliminated in judges' cull	

Awards and achievements
Preceded by Millie-Mae Adams (Wales); İdil Bilgen (Turkey); Faith Bwalya (Zambia); Anna-Lise Nanton (Trinidad and Tobago)	Miss World; Head-to Head Winner; 2026	Incumbent
New title	Miss World; Head-to Head Continental Winner — Asia and Oceania; 2026	Incumbent
Preceded by Krishnah Gravidez (Baguio)	Miss World Philippines; 2026	Incumbent
Preceded by Caroline Babcock (Farmington)	Miss New Mexico Teen USA; 2023	Succeeded by Fernanda Gonzalez (Albuquerque)
