= Miss World Philippines =

Beauty pageant

- Type: Women's beauty pageant
- Parent organization: ALV Pageant Circle
- Country represented: Philippines
- Qualifies for: Miss World
- First edition: 2011
- Most recent edition: 2026
- Current titleholder: Asia Rose Simpson; Quezon City
- President and National Director: Arnold Vegafria
- General Manager: Aldrich Maru Dabao
- Creative Director and Head Fashion Stylist: Francis Rey Chee
- Website: www.missworldphilippines.org

Miss World Philippines is a beauty pageant in the Philippines that selects the country's representatives to the Miss World, one of the Big Four international beauty pageants.

The pageant also selects representative to participate in minor international pageants. In addition the organizer of the pageant also held its male counterpart Mister World Philippines to pick representatives to participate in Mister World.

The pageant is inspired by the Miss World Ltd.'s slogan "Beauty with a Purpose" and henceforth adopted the theme "Beauty in Giving."

The winner and her court work with charities that benefit children in need and also join movements of supporting women and children's rights and many more advocacies.

== History ==
The pageant was officially launched on March 23, 2011, at the SMDC Showroom at the SM Mall of Asia.

Quirino resigned as the national director on January 15, 2017, due to personal and business reasons. A day later, Arnold Vegafria, who served as the talent manager of Miss World 2013 Megan Young, took over the position after he met with Morley. Under Vegafria's leadership, additional minor international beauty pageant titles are awarded for which they will represent the Philippines internationally.

Prior to Miss World Philippines, the title was awarded through the Miss Republic of the Philippines pageant from 1966 to 1976, then by Mutya ng Pilipinas, Inc. through Mutya ng Pilipinas pageant from 1977 to 1991, and Binibining Pilipinas Charities, Inc. through the Binibining Pilipinas pageant from 1992 to 2010.

== Titles ==
Here is the full list of remaining titles to be contested at the Miss World Philippines competition.

Current titles
Membership	Year	Wins
Miss World	2011 – Present	1 (2013)
Universal Woman	2024 – Present	1 (2024)
Miss Global	2026 – Present	0
Miss Asia Pacific International	2026 – Present	0
Miss Tourism Worldwide	2026 – Present	1 (2026)
Miss Tourism Queen of the Year International	2026 – Present	0
Miss Elite	2026 – Present	1 (2026)
Former titles
Membership	Year	Wins
Reina Hispanoamericana	2017 – 2022, 2024	2 (2017, 2025)
Face of Beauty International	2024	1 (2024)
Miss Multinational	2017 – 2024	1 (2017)
Miss Eco International	2018 – 2023	2 (2018, 2022)
Miss Eco Teen International	2019 – 2022	1 (2020)
Miss Supranational	2021 – 2022	0
Miss Tourism World	2022	0
Miss Environment International	2021	0
Special title
Miss Tourism	2019 – 2024	

== Editions ==
Below is the complete list of Miss World Philippines editions.

Edition	Date	Presenters	Broadcasters	Number of official candidates	Pageant venue
1st	September 18, 2011	Dingdong Dantes, Isabelle Daza, Carla Abellana	GMA Network	25	Philippine International Convention Center, Pasay
2nd	June 24, 2012	Edu Manzano, Ruffa Gutierrez, Patricia Fernandez, Mr. Fu, Victor Basa, John James Uy	TV5	25	Manila Hotel Tent City, Manila
3rd	August 18, 2013	Carla Abellana, KC Montero, Victor Basa, Gwendoline Ruais, Divine Lee	GMA Network	25	Solaire Resort & Casino, Parañaque
4th	October 12, 2014	Mikael Daez, Janine Gutierrez, Gwendoline Ruais, Tim Yap	GMA Network	26	Mall of Asia Arena, Pasay
5th	October 18, 2015	Iya Villania, Tim Yap, Gwendoline Ruais	GMA Network	26	Solaire Resort & Casino, Parañaque
6th	October 2, 2016	Gwendoline Ruais, Richard Gutierrez, Queenierich Rehman	GMA Network	24	Manila Hotel Tent City, Manila
7th	September 3, 2017	KC Montero, Iya Villania, Carla Abellana	GMA Network	35	Mall of Asia Arena, Pasay
8th	October 7, 2018	Francisco Escobar, Ruffa Gutierrez, Carla Abellana	GMA Network	40	Mall of Asia Arena, Pasay
9th	September 15, 2019	Laura Lehmann, Victor Basa, Edgar Allan Guzman, Winwyn Marquez	GMA Network	40	Smart Araneta Coliseum, Quezon City
10th	October 3, 2021	Xian Lim, RJ Ledesma, Alyssa Muhlach, JB Saliba	GMA Network	45	Subic Bay Exhibition and Convention Center, Olongapo, Zambales
11th	June 5, 2022	Laura Lehmann, Valerie Weigmann, Katarina Rodriguez	CNN Philippines	36	Mall of Asia Arena, Pasay
12th	July 19, 2024	Billy Crawford, Maria Gigante, Teejay Marquez, Emmanuelle Vera	TV5	33	Mall of Asia Arena, Pasay
13th	February 3, 2026	Leo Consul, Tracy Perez, Maria Gigante, Jasmine Omay	TV5	24	Mall of Asia Arena, Pasay

== Titleholders ==
Year	Miss World Philippines	Runners-up				Ref.
Year	Miss World Philippines	1st Princess	2nd Princess	3rd Princess	4th Princess	Ref.
Representatives under the directorship of Cory Quirino (CQ Global Quest)
2011	Gwendoline Ruais	Helen Nicolette Henson	Martha Chloe McCulley	Maria Paula Bianca Paz	Jaysel Arrozal	
2012	Queenierich Rehman	Mary Ann Misa	Vanessa Claudine Ammann	April Love Jordan	Brenna Cassandra Gamboa	
2013	Megan Young	Janicel Lubina	Zahra Bianca Saldua	Maria Paula Bianca Paz	Omarie Linn Osuna	
2014	Valerie Weigmann	Lorraine Kendrickson	Nelda Dorothea Ibe	Nicole Kim Donesa	Rachel Peters	
2015	Hillarie Parungao	Marita Cassandra Naidas	Mia Allyson Howell	Maria Vanessa Wright	Emma Mary Tiglao	
2016	Catriona Gray	Arienne Louise Calingo	Ivanna Kamil Pacis	Marah Muñoz	Sandra Lemonon	
Representatives under the directorship of Arnold Vegafria (ALV Pageant Circle)
2017	Laura Lehmann	Glyssa Leiann Perez	Zara Carbonell	Not awarded		
2018	Katarina Rodriguez	Chanel Morales	Pearl Hung	Not awarded		
2019	Michelle Dee	Shannon Christie Kerver	Casie Banks	Not awarded		
2020	Pageant not held due to COVID-19 pandemic					
2021	Tracy Perez	Riana Agatha Pangindian	Janelle Lewis^{α}	Not awarded		
2022^{β}	Gwendolyne Fourniol	Justine Beatrice Felizarta	Cassandra Chan	Not awarded		
2023	Pageant not held due to the delay of Miss World 2023					
2024	Krishnah Gravidez	Jasmine Omay	Sophia Bianca Santos	Not awarded		
2025	Pageant not held due to the delays of previous Miss World editions					
2026	Asia Rose Simpson	Anne De Mesa	Gabrielle Galapia	Not awarded		

=== Notes ===
- ^α Janelle Lewis was promoted to take over as 2nd Princess after Ganiel Krishnan resigned a day after the coronation.
- ^β In 2022, the 1st and 2nd Princesses were named Miss World Philippines Tourism and Charity, respectively.

== Placements ==
=== Current titles ===
==== Miss World ====
Year	Miss World Philippines	Hometown	Placement	Special award(s)	Ref.
2011	Gwendoline Ruais	Muntinlupa	1st Runner-Up	4 Special awards: Continental Queen of Beauty (Miss World Asia); Top 10 in Top Model; Top 30 in Beauty with a Purpose; Top 30 in Beach Beauty	
2012	Queenierich Rehman	Las Piñas	Top 15	4 Special awards: World Fashion Designer Award; Top 5 in Talent; Top 40 in Beach Beauty; Top 46 in Top Model	
2013	Megan Young	Olongapo	Miss World 2013	4 Special awards: Continental Queen of Beauty (Miss World Asia); Top Model Winner; 3rd Runner-Up in Multimedia; 4th Runner-Up in Beach Beauty	
2014	Valerie Weigmann	Legazpi	Top 25	2 Special awards: Top 10 in Beauty with a Purpose; Top 10 in People's Choice Award	
2015	Hillarie Parungao	Nueva Vizcaya	Top 10	4 Special awards: Multimedia Winner; 9th Place in Interview; Top 10 in People's Choice Award; Top 30 in Top Model	
2016	Catriona Gray	Oas	Top 5	3 Special awards: Multimedia Winner; Top 5 in Beauty with a Purpose; Top 10 in Talent	
2017	Laura Lehmann	Makati	Top 40	3 Special awards: Beauty with a Purpose Winner; Head-to-Head Challenge Winner; Top 10 in People's Choice Award	
2018	Katarina Rodriguez	Davao City	Unplaced	3 Special awards: Head-to-Head Challenge Winner (Round 1); Top 10 in People's Choice Award; Top 32 in Top Model	
2019	Michelle Dee	Makati	Top 12	3 Special awards: Head-to-Head Challenge Winner (Rounds 1 and 2); Top 20 in Beauty with a Purpose; Top 40 in Top Model	
2020	Pageant not held due to the COVID-19 pandemic				
2021	Tracy Perez	Cebu City	Top 13	2 Special awards: Beauty with a Purpose Winner; Head-to-Head Challenge Winner (Rounds 1 and 2)	
2022	Miss World 2021 was rescheduled to 16 March 2022 due to the COVID-19 pandemic outbreak in Puerto Rico, no edition started in 2022.				
2023	Gwendolyne Fourniol	Himamaylan	Unplaced	4 Special awards: Top 20 in Top Model; Top 23 in Talent; Top 25 in Head-to-Head Challenge; Top 32 in Sports	
2024	Miss World 2023 was rescheduled to 9 March 2024 due to the elections in India, no edition started in 2024.				
2025	Krishnah Gravidez	Baguio	Top 8	4 Special awards: Continental Queen of Beauty (Miss World Asia); Top 20 in Multimedia; Top 24 in Talent; Top 32 in Sports	
2026	Asia Rose Simpson	Quezon City	Top 12	6 Special awards: Head-to-Head Challenge Winner; Top 3 in Talent; Top 24 in Beauty with a Purpose (Top 6 in Asia and Oceania); Top 24 in People’s Choice Award; Top 24 in Sports; Top 60 in Top Model	

==== Universal Woman ====
Year	Universal Woman Philippines	Hometown	Placement	Special award(s)	Ref.
2024	Maria Gigante	Cebu	Universal Woman 2024	4 Special awards: Fan Vote Winner; UW MVLA; UW Social Media; UW Sympathy	
2025	Jasmine Omay	Tarlac	Top 13	—	
2026	Marizza Delgado	New York	Unplaced	—	

==== Miss Global ====
Year	Miss Global Philippines	Hometown	Placement	Special award(s)	Ref.
2026	Jayvee Lyn Loreto	Davao	3rd Runner-up	2 Special awards: Media Choice Award; Miss Global Asia & Oceania	

==== Miss Asia Pacific International ====
Year	Miss Asia Pacific Philippines	Hometown	Placement	Special award(s)	Ref.
2026	Gabrielle Galapia	Pampanga	3rd Runner-up	7 Special awards: Best in Evening Gown; Best in National Costume 1st Runner-Up; Best in Swimsuit; Darling of the Press; Miss Be Hotels and Resorts; Miss Eventologie; Miss Jpark Island Resort	

==== Miss Tourism Worldwide ====
Year	Miss Tourism Worldwide Philippines	Hometown	Placement	Special award(s)	Ref.
2026	Anne De Mesa	Manila	Miss Tourism Worldwide 2026	3 Special awards: Best in Evening Gown; Best in National Costume; Miss Celebrity	

==== Miss Tourism Queen of the Year International ====
Year	Miss Tourism Queen of the Year Philippines	Hometown	Placement	Special award(s)	Ref.
2026	Lorraine Ojimba	Rizal	TBA	TBA	

==== Miss Elite ====
Year	Miss Elite Philippines	Hometown	Placement	Special award(s)	Ref.
2026	Sophia Bianca Santos	Pampanga	Miss Elite 2026	1 Special award: Best in Evening Gown	

=== Former titles ===
==== Miss Multinational ====
Year	Miss Multinational Philippines	Hometown	Placement	Special award(s)	Ref.
2017	Sophia Señoron	Manila	Miss Multinational 2017	3 Special awards: Best in Interview; Miss Environment; Miss Speech	
2018	Kimilei Mugford	Ontario	Top 5	3 Special awards: Best in Sports; Best in Talent; Miss Multinational Asia	
2019	Isabelle de Leon	Quezon City	Pageant not held		
2021	Shaila Mae Rebortera	Cebu	Pageant not held		
2024	Nikki Buenafe Cheveh	Pangasinan	Pageant not held		

==== Reina Hispanoamericana ====
Year	Reina Hispanoamericana Filipinas	Hometown	Placement	Special award(s)	Ref.
2017	Teresita Ssen Marquez	Parañaque	Reina Hispanoamericana 2017	—	
2018	Alyssa Muhlach	Pasig	Unplaced	—	
2019	Maria Katrina Llegado	Taguig	5th Runner-Up	—	
2020	Pageant not held due to the COVID-19 pandemic				
2021	Emmanuelle Fabienne Camcam	Taguig	3rd Runner-Up	—	
2022	Maria Ingrid Teresita Santa Maria	Parañaque	Top 14	—	
2024	Pageant not held				
2025	Deanna Marie Maté	Cavite	Reina Hispanoamericana 2025	1 Special award: Best Traditional Costume	
Title awarded through Miss Grand Philippines in 2023 and 2025

==== Face of Beauty International ====
Year	Face of Beauty Philippines	Hometown	Placement	Special award(s)	Ref.
2024	Jeanne Isabelle Bilasano	Bicol Region	Face of Beauty International 2024	4 Special awards: Best in Evening Gown; Best in National Costume; Best in Swimwear; People’s Choice	
Title awarded through Miss Grand Philippines in 2025

==== Miss Environment International ====
Year	Miss Environment Philippines	Hometown	Placement	Special award(s)	Ref.
2021	Michelle Arceo	Makati	1st Runner-Up	—	
Mutya ng Pilipinas acquired the franchise in 2022

==== Miss Tourism World ====
Year	Miss World Philippines Tourism	Hometown	Placement	Special award(s)	Ref.
2022	Justine Beatrice Felizarta	Marikina	1st Runner-Up	—	
Hiyas ng Pilipinas acquired the franchise in 2023

==== Miss Supranational ====
Year	Miss Supranational Philippines	Hometown	Placement	Special award(s)	Ref.
2021	Dindi Joy Pajares	Orani, Bataan	Top 12	—	
2022	Alison Black	Las Piñas	Top 24	1 Special award: Miss Talent	
The Miss Philippines acquired the franchise in 2023

==== Miss Eco International ====
Year	Miss Eco Philippines	Hometown	Placement	Special award(s)	Ref.
2018	Cynthia Thomalla	Cebu	Miss Eco International 2018	3 Special awards: Best in Eco Dress Top 15; Best in Resorts Wear Top 10; Best in Talent Top 15	
2019	Maureen Ann Montagne	Batangas	1st Runner-Up	1 Special award: Best in Resorts Wear 2nd Runner-up	
2020	Pageant not held due to the COVID-19 pandemic				
2021	Kelley Day	Tarlac City	1st Runner-Up	1 Special award: Best in National Costume	
2022	Kathleen Paton	Aklan	Miss Eco International 2022	1 Special award: Best Eco Video	
2023	Ashley Montenegro	Makati	Top 21	—	
The Miss Philippines acquired the franchise in 2024

==== Miss Eco Teen International ====
Year	Miss Eco Teen Philippines	Hometown	Placement	Special award(s)	Ref.
2019	Mary Daena Zaide Resurreccion	Manila	Top 5	—	
2020	Roberta Angela Tamondong	San Pablo	Miss Eco Teen 2020	4 Special awards: Best in Eco Dress; Best in National Costume; Best in Resorts Wear 1st Runner-Up; Best in Talent 2nd Runner-Up	
2021	Tatyana Alexi Austria	Parañaque	1st Runner-Up	2 Special awards: Best in Eco Dress 1st Runner-Up; Miss Vatika	
2022	Francesca Beatriz McLelland	Aklan	1st Runner-Up	4 Special awards: Best in Eco Dress 2nd Runner-Up; Best in National Costume; Best in Resorts Wear; Best in Talent 2nd Runner-Up	
Title awarded through Miss Grand Philippines in 2023. The Miss Philippines acquired the franchise in 2024

== See also ==
- Philippines at major beauty pageants
- Big Four beauty pageants
- List of beauty pageants
- Miss Universe Philippines
- Miss World Philippines
- Binibining Pilipinas
- Miss Philippines Earth
- Reina Filipinas
- The Miss Philippines
- Miss Island Philippines
- Mutya ng Pilipinas
- Miss Pearl of the Orient Philippines
- Miss Republic of the Philippines
