= Krishnah Gravidez =

Filipino beauty pageant titleholder

- Gravidez in 2026
- Born: Santiago, Ilocos Sur, Philippines
- Education: University of Northern Philippines (BSCE)
- Beauty pageant titleholder
- Title: Miss World Philippines 2024; Miss World Asia 2025
- Major competitions: Miss Universe Philippines 2023; (Top 5); Miss World Philippines 2024; (Winner); Miss World 2025; (Top 8); (Miss World Asia)

Krishnah Marie Estacio Gravidez (Tagalog: [ˈkrɪʃnə ɡraviˈdez]) is a Filipino beauty pageant titleholder who won Miss World Philippines 2024. She represented the Philippines at Miss World 2025, where she reached the top eight and was named the continental queen for Asia.

She previously represented Baguio at Miss Universe Philippines 2023, finishing in the top five. She was later appointed as the Philippines' contestant for Miss Charm, but withdrew to compete in Miss World Philippines 2024, which she won.

== Early life and education ==
Krishnah Gravidez was born in Santiago, Ilocos Sur. Her name, Krishnah, was given by her father, combining "Kristo" (Jesus Christ) and "Noah" (Noah's Ark). She began working at the age of 14 to support her education, starting by selling beauty kits online. By the age of 16, she was employed as a cook. She also worked as a virtual assistant, advertising specialist, and content editor. She initially studied industrial engineering at Saint Louis University in Baguio before transferring to the University of Northern Philippines in Vigan, Ilocos Sur, to pursue civil engineering.

== Pageantry ==
=== Miss Universe Philippines 2023 ===
On February 18, 2023, Gravidez was announced as one of the 40 contestants of Miss Universe Philippines 2023, representing Baguio after winning Miss Baguio 2022. In the national costume competition, she wore a strawberry-inspired outfit by Erjohn dela Serna, made from Cordilleran textiles, which earned her the "Tingog ng Filipina" award for Luzon.

During the coronation night, she won Best in Swimsuit and advanced to the top five. In the final question-and-answer segment, she spoke on the transformative power of kindness. She finished in the top five, with Michelle Dee of Makati winning the contest.

Following the pageant, Gravidez was appointed Miss Charm Philippines 2024 in a ceremony at Okada Manila. The Baguio City Government later issued a resolution in her honor and held a motorcade. On May 23, 2024, she crowned Cyrille Payumo of Pampanga as her successor.

=== Miss World Philippines 2024 ===
Gravidez was to represent the Philippines at Miss Charm 2024 in Vietnam, but due to uncertainties surrounding the event, she withdrew on June 2, 2024. The next day, she was introduced as a candidate for Miss World Philippines 2024, representing Baguio.

At the charity gala on July 18, 2024, she received four special awards. The following day, during the coronation event at SM Mall of Asia Arena, she was awarded Miss Photogenic, Best in Swimsuit, Best in Evening Gown, and seven sponsor awards.

She reacghed the top 20 through the Top Model and Miss Multimedia fast track events, then advanced to the top 10. Asked whether inclusivity should be prioritized in pageantry, she emphasized the role of pageants as advocacy platforms and the need for adaptability in an evolving world.

At the end of the event, she was crowned Miss World Philippines 2024 by outgoing titleholder, Gwendolyne Fourniol, and Miss World 2023, Krystyna Pyszková.

=== Miss World 2025 ===
Gravidez represented the Philippines at Miss World 2025, held in Telangana, India, and reached the top eight, and was later awarded the continental title, Miss World Asia 2025. She wore a white and silver gown by Rian Fernandez during the final event. In the Q&A segment, she spoke on the importance of interconnectedness and highlighted the qualities she observed in fellow contestants, including problem-solving, gentleness, resilience, and warmth.

== Advocacy ==
Gravidez is the founder of Colors of Kindness, a non-profit organization that promotes the welfare of children and youth.

Awards and achievements
Preceded by (Lebanon) Yasmina Zaytoun	Miss World Asia & Oceania; 2025	Succeeded by Taanusiya Chetty
Preceded by Gwendolyne Fourniol (Negros Occidental)	Miss World Philippines; 2024	Succeeded by Asia Simpson (Quezon City)
Preceded by Annabelle McDonnell (Misamis Oriental)	Miss Charm Philippines; 2024 (Resigned)	Succeeded by Kayla Carter (Northern California)
