= Reina Hispanoamericana 2026 =

- Date: February 22, 2026
- Venue: Salón Sirionó Fexpocruz, Santa Cruz, Bolivia
- Broadcaster: Red Uno (Live)
- Entrants: 28
- Placements: 13
- Debuts: France; India
- Withdrawals: Honduras
- Winner: Kimberly de Boer; Curaçao
- Congeniality: Ariday Villar (Cuba)
- Best National Costume: Ami Ocampo (Ecuador)

Reina Hispanoamericana 2026 was the 34th Reina Hispanoamericana pageant, held at the Salón Sirionó, Fexpocruz in Santa Cruz de la Sierra, Bolivia, on February 21, 2026. The competition featured twenty-eight contestants from three different continents — the Americas, Europe and Asia — and was broadcast by Red Uno of Bolivia, with promotion by Gloria de Limpias under the trademark Promociones Gloria.

Dia Maté of the Philippines crowned Kimberly de Boer of Curaçao as her successor at the end of the event. This was Curaçao's second-overall victory in 15 years.

== Results ==
=== Placements ===
Position	Contestant
Reina Hispanoamericana 2026	Curaçao – Kimberly de Boer
Virreina Hispanoamericana 2026	Colombia – Marta Isabel Otero
1st Runner-Up	Dominican Republic – Criselys García
2nd Runner-Up	Mexico – Melissa Payró
3rd Runner-Up	Puerto Rico – Tiffany González
4th Runner-Up	Peru – Camila Chacón
5th Runner-Up	Venezuela – Emely Barile
6th Runner-Up	Nicaragua – Luz González
Top 13	Bolivia – Eugenia Redin; Canada – Malayika Kwizera; Ecuador – Ami Ocampo; Panama – Anayansi de Gracía; Philippines – Beatriz Mclelland

=== Special awards ===
Most of the awards below were presented by sponsors:

Award	Contestant
Miss Ecojet	Venezuela – Emely Barile
Miss Congeniality	Cuba – Ariday Villar
Miss Tourism International	Curaçao – Kimberly de Boer
Miss Radiant Skin by Solaris	Canada – Malayika Kwizera
Best Silhouette by Medical Center	Puerto Rico – Tiffany González
Nueva Santa Cruz Ambassador	Peru – Camila Chacón
Best National Costume	Ecuador – Ami Ocampo
Best Smile by Orest	Bolivia – Eugenia Redin
Miss Cataleya	Venezuela – Emely Barile

== Contestants ==
28 Contestants competed for the title;

Country/Territory	Contestant	Age	Hometown	Ref.
Argentina	Guadalupe Rocío González	22	La Rioja	
Bolivia	Daniela Eugenia Redin	24	Santa Cruz	
Brazil	Cássia Adriane Bezerra	25	Belém	
Canada	Malayika Amy Kwizera	24	Ottawa	
Chile	Cristina Avilés Moroso	24	Puente Alto	
Colombia	Marta Isabel Otero Blanco	25	Montería	
Costa Rica	Camila Mena Murillo	20	Pérez Zeledón	
Cuba	Ariday Villar	31	Ciego de Ávila	
Curaçao	Kimberly de Boer	21	Willemstad	
Dominican Republic	Criselys García	25	Baní	
Ecuador	Ami Ocampo Salgado	21	Manta	
El Salvador	María José "Majo" Cruz	20	San Salvador	
France	Ludmilla Miallet	23	Vertou	
Guatemala	Ana Lucía Guerra	23	Santa Rosa	
Guyana	Ivanna Ivanoff Arrieta	19	Maracaibo	
India	Tanya Naidu	22	Bengaluru	
Mexico	Melissa Payró	28	Merida	
Nicaragua	Luz Solage González Flores	27	Boaco	
Panama	Anayansi Cristel de Gracía	26	Dolega	
Paraguay	Andrea Jimena Sosa	25	Hohenau	
Peru	Camila Beatriz Chacón Gálvez	21	Lima	
Philippines	Beatriz Abalajon Mclelland	21	Aklan	
Poland	Oliwia Cieślik	20	Bycina	
Puerto Rico	Tiffany González	24	Dorado	
Spain	Maira Díaz Borredá	24	Ontinyent	
United States	Lucianny Hernández Brito	23	San Francisco de Macorís	
Uruguay	Ana Claudia González	23	Las Piedras	
Venezuela	Emely Francesca Barile	23	Valencia	

== Trivia ==
- Malayika Amy Kwizera (Canada) was born in the United States. She is the daughter of retired Burundian middle distance runner Dieudonné Kwizera.
- Ivanna Arrieta (Guyana) was born in Maracaibo, Venezuela and move with her family to Chile at the age of 7.
- Lucianny Hernández (United States) is Dominican descent from San Francisco de Macorís.
