= Marizza Delgado =

American beauty pageant titleholder

- Born: Marizza Delgado; San Jose, California, U.S.
- Education: University of California, Santa Cruz (BS)
- Beauty pageant titleholder
- Title: Miss New York Earth 2021; Miss New York USA 2024; Universal Woman Philippines 2026
- Major competitions: Miss New York Earth 2021; (Winner); Miss Earth USA 2021; (Top 20); Miss New York USA 2022; (3rd runner-up); Miss New York USA 2023; (3rd runner-up); Miss New York USA 2024; (Winner); Miss USA 2024; (Top 20); Miss World Philippines 2026; (Top 10); Universal Woman 2026; (Unplaced)

Marizza Delgado is an American beauty pageant titleholder who was crowned Miss New York USA 2024. She is the first Filipina-American to win this title.

Delgado previously competed in the Miss New York USA pageant in 2022 and 2023, where she placed as 3rd runner-up, winning the title on her third attempt. On 4 August 2024, Delgado competed in the Miss USA 2024 pageant where she finished in the top 20. She was previously crowned Miss New York Earth 2021 and competed in the Miss Earth USA 2021 pageant where she placed in the top 20. She later competed in Miss World Philippines 2026, where she reached the Top 10 and received the Miss Universal Woman Philippines 2026 title. She represented the Philippines at Universal Woman 2026.

== Early life and education ==
Delgado was born in San Jose, California to two Filipino immigrants from Cavite and Pampanga. She attended the University of California, Santa Cruz and graduated in 2021 with a Bachelor of Science in Technology and Information Management. She then moved to New York City to pursue a career in fashion and data science where she now works as a model and an engineer.

== Pageantry ==
Delgado first started her career in pageantry when she was first crowned Miss New York Earth 2021 which qualified her for the Miss Earth USA 2021 pageant where she placed in the top 20.

In 2022, she competed in the Miss New York USA 2022 pageant and placed as 3rd runner-up. The following year, Delgado attempted to win the Miss New York USA 2023 title where she placed again as 3rd runner-up. On her third attempt in 2024, she finally won the title and competed in the Miss USA 2024 title, finishing in the top 20, where Alma Cooper of Michigan won the title.

In 2026, Delgado competed in Miss World Philippines 2026, representing the Filipino Community of New York where she placed in the Top 10. At the end of the event, she was announced as winner of the Miss Universal Woman Philippines title. She represented the Philippines at Miss Universal Woman 2026, but did not advance to the Top 24.

In her pageantry stints, Delgado has advocated for ethical and sustainable vegan lifestyles, and women in STEM.

Awards and achievements
Preceded by Rachelle Di Stasio	Miss New York USA; 2024	Succeeded by Christiana DiNardo
