= Beatriz Mclelland =

Filipino model, beauty pageant titleholder

Beatriz Mclleland
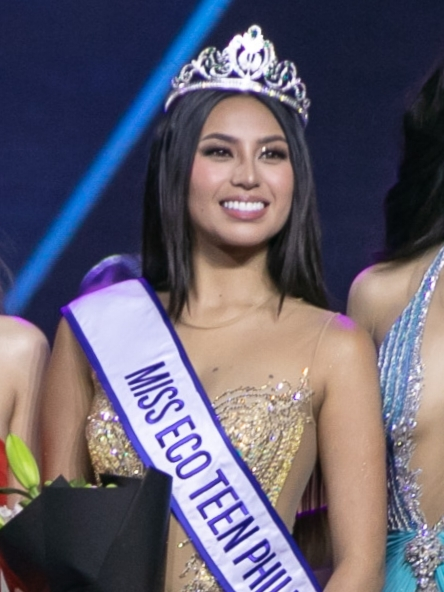
- Mclleland in 2022
- Born: Francesca Beatriz Abalajon Mclleland; Aklan, Philippines
- Beauty pageant titleholder
- Title: Miss Eco Teen Philippines 2022; Reina Hispanoamericana Filipinas 2026
- Major competition: Miss World Philippines 2022 (Winner – Miss Eco Teen Philippines 2022) Miss Eco Teen International 2022 (1st Runner-up) Binibining Pilipinas 2025 (Top 14) Miss Grand Philippines 2025 (Top 15) (Reina Hispanoamericana Filipinas 2026) Reina Hispanoamericana 2026 (Top 13)

Francesca Beatriz Abalajon Mclleland is a Filipina model and beauty pageant titleholder who was crowned Reina Hispanoamericana Filipinas 2026

Mclleland previously competed at Miss World Philippines 2022 where she was crowned Miss Eco Teen Philippines 2022, she represented the Philippines at the Miss Eco Teen International 2022 pageant where she placed as first runner-up. In 2025 she joined Binibining Pilipinas 2025 where she placed as top 14 finalist, after joining Binibining Pilipinas 2025, she joined Miss Grand Philippines 2025 where she was crowned Reina Hispanoamericana Filipinas 2026. She represented the Philippines at Reina Hispanoamericana 2026, where she finished in the Top 13.

Awards and achievements
Preceded by Dia Maté (Cavite)	Reina Hispanoamericana Filipinas; 2026	Succeeded by Incumbent
Preceded by (Philippines) Tatyana Alexi Austria	Miss Eco Teen International (1st Runner-up); 2022	Succeeded by (Indonesia) Anthea Tofani
Preceded by Tatyana Alexi Austria (Parañaque)	Miss Eco Teen Philippines; 2022	Succeeded by Francine Reyes (Tarlac)
