= Emmanuelle Vera =

Filipino actress, singer and beauty pageant titleholder

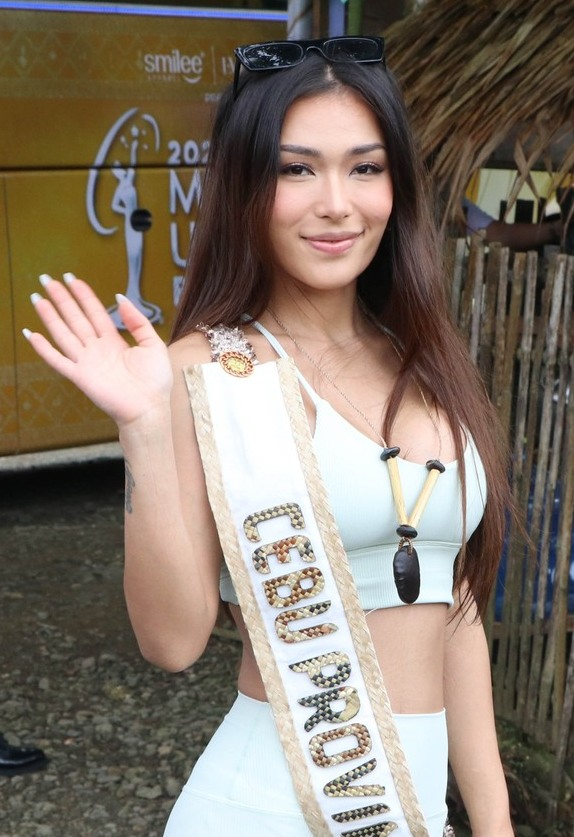
- Vera in 2023
- Born: Emmanuelle Vera; November 17, 1994 (age 31); Taguig, Metro Manila, Philippines
- Education: St. Paul College, Pasig; Ateneo de Manila University
- Occupations: Singer; actress
- Years active: 2010–present
- Label: Tarsier Records
- Beauty pageant titleholder
- Title: Reina Hispanoamericana Filipinas 2021
- Major competitions: Miss World Philippines 2021; (Winner – Reina Hispanoamericana Filipinas 2021); Reina Hispanoamericana 2021; (3rd runner-up); Miss Universe Philippines 2023; (Top 18)

Emmanuelle Vera (born November 17, 1994) is a Filipino singer, actress and beauty pageant titleholder. She won Reina Hispanoamericana Filipinas 2021, and represented the Philippines at Reina Hispanoamericana 2021, finishing as third runner-up.

== Career ==
=== Acting career ===
Vera played Diana Rosales in the musical television show 1DOL on ABS-CBN. She was also one of the main cast of Shoutout!, a youth-oriented variety show. She has also appeared in numerous television shows including Maalaala Mo Kaya and 100 Days to Heaven.

In April 2017, Vera left Star Magic and Cornerstone Entertainment after seven years. In 2018, she made her debut appearance on GMA Network in The Stepdaughters.

=== Music career ===
In 2012, Vera released her eponymous debut album under Universal Records Philippines. The album has six original tracks, and a cover. Vera also appeared as a celebrity video jockey in April on the Filipino music channel Myx.

In 2013, Vera auditioned for first season of The Voice of the Philippines, singing "Somewhere Over The Rainbow" from the 1939 film, The Wizard of Oz. She was eliminated in the battle round.

On January 25, 2015, she appeared in the music video for singer Thor Dulay's "Paano Ko Sasabihin".

In 2016, she joined the celebrity competition We Love OPM and became part of the trio O Diva together with Klarisse de Guzman and Liezel Garcia, mentored by KZ Tandingan, and was third.

=== Pageantry ===
==== Miss World Philippines 2021 ====
In October 2021, as part of Miss World Philippines 2021, Vera won Reina Hispanoamericana Filipinas 2021 succeeding Maria Katrina Llegado.

==== Reina Hispanoamericana 2021 ====
Vera represented the Philippines at Reina Hispanoamericana 2021 on October 30, 2021 in Bolivia, and was third runner-up.

==== Miss Universe Philippines 2023 ====
Vera entered Miss Universe Philippines 2023, and reached the top 18.

== Discography ==
- By Popular Demand 2 (2011)
- Emmanuelle (2012)

== Filmography ==
=== Film ===
Year	Title	Role	Ref.
2014	Ang Kwento Nating Dalawa	Isa	
2018	Kung Paano Siya Nawala	Shana 2	
2019	Tayo Sa Huling Buwan Ng Taon	Isa	

=== Television ===
Year	Title	Role	Ref.
2010	1DOL	Diana Rosales	
2010–2011	Shoutout!	Herself	
2011	Maalaala Mo Kaya: Tropeo	Susan	
2011	100 Days to Heaven	Yanie Ramirez	
2012	Maynila	Herself	
2013	Maalaala Mo Kaya: Family Picture	Karen Balot	
2013	The Voice of the Philippines	Herself	
2013	Got to Believe	Marga	
2014	Maalaala Mo Kaya: Santan	Anna	
2015	Nasaan Ka Nang Kailangan Kita	Chloe	
2015	Maalaala Mo Kaya: Bintana	Jessica	
2015	Pangako Sa 'Yo	Chelsea	
2016	FPJ's Ang Probinsyano	April Hizon	
2017	The Better Half	Ashley Fuentes	
2017	La Luna Sangre	May	
2017	Wildflower	Young Helena Montoya	
2017	Ipaglaban Mo!: Pasaway	Ina	
2018	Bagani	Mayara	
2018	Magpakailanman: Hayaan mo sila: The Ex-Battalion Story	Anna	
2018	The Stepdaughters	Nikki	
2018	Inday Will Always Love You	Jana	
2020	Fluid	Wings	
2022–2023	The Iron Heart	Athena Omorfia	
2023–2024	Can't Buy Me Love	Geline	
2025	Incognito	Shari	
2026	The Loyalty Game	Katrina	

== Personal life ==
In August 2018, she became engaged to Filipino-Spanish actor Niko del Rosario.

Preceded by (Paraguay) Ketlin Lottermann	Reina Hispanoamericana 3rd Runner-Up; 2021	Succeeded by (Mexico) Diana Robles
Preceded by Katrina Llegado	Reina Hispanoamericana Filipinas; 2021	Succeeded by Ingrid Santamaria
