= Reina Filipinas =

National beauty pageant competition in the Philippines

- Established: June 10, 2026; 5 months ago
- Type: Beauty pageant
- Members: Miss Grand International; MGI All Stars
- Official language: English; Filipino
- National Director: Emma Tiglao
- President and CEO: Jojo Bragais
- Executive Partner: Nawat Itsaragrisil
- Current titleholder: Angelica Lopez; Palawan

Reina Filipinas is a national beauty pageant in the Philippines. Founded in 2026, it will select Filipino representatives to compete in the Miss Grand International pageant and its all-star spin-off.

== History ==
Reina Filipinas was founded by Filipino businessperson and shoe designer Jojo Bragais. The pageant was officially unveiled to the public in an event held in Pasay on June 10, 2026. The pageant is headed by Bragais as its president, with Miss Grand International 2025, Emma Tiglao, serving as the pageant's national director. Nawat Itsaragrisil, president of the Miss Grand International pageant would also serve as the pageant's official executive partner.

The pageant's first edition was held on August 7, 2026 at the Newport Performing Arts Theater in Pasay.

== Titleholders ==
Legend

- : Finished as a semi-finalist

=== Main winners ===
Edition & Year	Represented	Reina Filipinas Grand International	Age	Placement	Special Award(s)	Ref(s).
14th 2026	Palawan	Angelica Lopez	25	Top 25	Best National Costume	

=== All-star winners ===
Edition & Year	Represented	Reina Filipinas MGI All Stars	Age	Placement	Special Award(s)	Ref(s).
2nd 2026	Iloilo City	Alexie Brooks	25	TBD	TBD	TBD
2nd 2026	Manila	Anne Patricia Diaz	28	TBD	TBD	TBD

== See also ==
- Philippines at major beauty pageants
- Big Four beauty pageants
- List of beauty pageants
- Miss Universe Philippines
- Miss World Philippines
- Binibining Pilipinas
- Miss Philippines Earth
- Reina Filipinas
- The Miss Philippines
- Miss Island Philippines
- Mutya ng Pilipinas
- Miss Pearl of the Orient Philippines
- Miss Republic of the Philippines
