= Miss World Philippines 2021 =

10th Miss World Philippines pageant

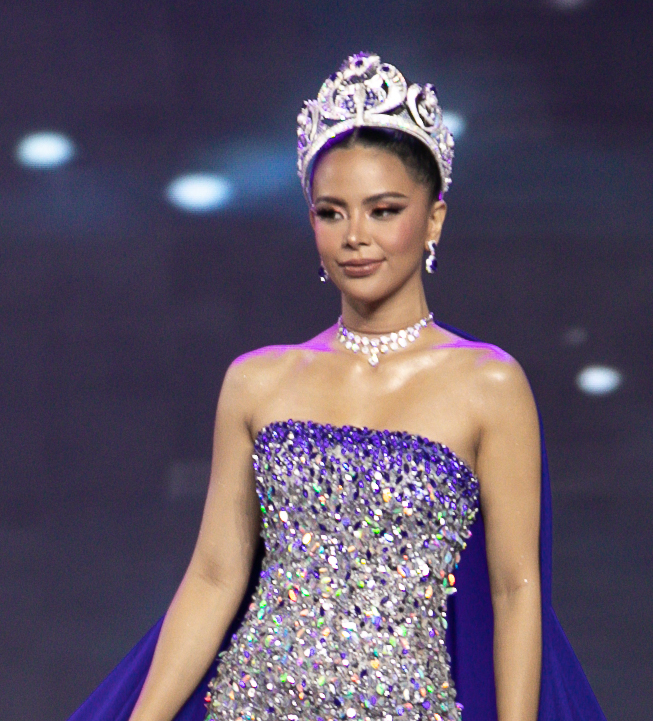
- Tracy Perez
- Date: October 3, 2021
- Presenters: Xian Lim; RJ Ledesma; Alyssa Muhlach; JB Saliba
- Entertainment: RJ Agustin
- Theme: Fresh Filipina for the World
- Venue: Subic Bay Exhibition and Convention Center Hall A, Subic Special Economic and Freeport Zone, Olongapo, Zambales, Philippines
- Broadcaster: KTX; GMA Network
- Entrants: 44
- Placements: 24
- Withdrawals: San Pablo, Laguna
- Winner: Tracy Perez; Cebu City
- Best National Costume: Ann Palmares, Iloilo City
- Photogenic: Kathleen Joy Paton, Aklan

Miss World Philippines 2021 was the tenth Miss World Philippines pageant, held at the Subic Bay Exhibition and Convention Center Hall A in Olongapo, Zambales, Philippines, on October 3, 2021.

Michelle Dee crowned Tracy Perez of Cebu City as her successor at the end of the event. Perez represented the Philippines at Miss World 2021 and reached the top thirteen.

== Background ==
=== Date and location ===
The event was initially scheduled for July 11, 2021. However, due to the COVID-19 pandemic, it moved at least four times; first to July 25, 2021, second to August 8, 2021, third to September 19, 2021, and finally to October 3, 2021.

== Results ==
=== Placements ===
Color keys

- The contestant won an international pageant.
- The contestant was a runner-up in an international pageant.
- The contestant was a semi-finalist in an international pageant.

Placement	Contestant	International Placement
Miss World Philippines 2021	#36 – Tracy Perez	Top 13 – Miss World 2021
Miss Eco Philippines 2021	#38 – Kathleen Joy Paton	Miss Eco International 2022
Reina Hispanoamericana Filipinas 2021	#8 – Emmanuelle Vera	3rd Runner-Up – Reina Hispanoamericana 2021
Miss Environment Philippines 2021	#10 – Michelle Arceo	1st Runner-Up – Miss Environment International 2022
Miss Multinational Philippines 2021	#6 – Shaila Mae Rebortera	Pageant Not Held
Miss Tourism Philippines 2021	#27 – Trisha Martinez	Special Title
Miss Eco Teen Philippines 2021	#18 – Tatyana Alexi Austria	1st Runner-Up – Miss Eco Teen International 2021
First Princess	#31 – Riana Agatha Pangindian	
Second Princess	#43 – Ganiel Akrisha Krishnan (Resigned); #4 – Janelle Lewis (Assumed)	
Top 15	#1 – Lea Macapagal; #14 – Gwendolyne Fourniol; #25 – Danica Therese Dilla; #29 – Ann Palmares; #30 – Julie Tarrayo	
Top 24	#3 – Joy Barcoma; #11 – Megan Deen Campbell; #12 – Natasha Jung; #16 – Anne de Mesa; #17 – Dannah Joy Tempra; #19 – Asha Gutierrez; #23 – Shannen Manzano; #26 – Jo-Ann Flores; #41 – Samela Godin	

=== Appointed titleholder ===
Candidate #22, Dindi Joy Pajares, was elected to compete and represent Philippines in the Miss Supranational pageant in Poland. Pajares was voted by her fellow Miss World Philippines 2021 candidates who participated in a poll organized in lieu of a staged competition due to the postponement of the finals night.

Title	Delegate	International Placement	Ref.
Miss Supranational Philippines 2021	Orani, Bataan – Dindi Joy Pajares	Top 12 – Miss Supranational 2021	

== Awards ==
=== Special awards ===
Results	Contestant	Ref.
Miss Blue Water Day Spa	#36 – Tracy Perez	
Best Skin by Cathy Valencia Award	#27 – Trisha Martinez	
Miss Silka	#4 – Janelle Lewis	
Miss Pacquiao Coffee	#31 – Riana Agatha Pangindian	
Miss Tyro Sorta	#27 – Trisha Martinez	
Miss Artopian International	#36 – Tracy Perez	
Miss Deity Serum Award	#8 – Emmanuelle Vera	
Miss Red Hotel	#1 – Lea Macapagal	
Miss Bench	#36 – Tracy Perez	
Miss GAOC	#10 – Michelle Arceo	
Miss Dermfix	#36 – Tracy Perez	
Miss We Provide Inc.	#6 – Shaila Mae Rebortera	
Miss Sekara Subic	#19 – Asha Gutierrez	
Best in Swimsuit	#36 – Tracy Perez	
Best in Bench Body	#36 – Tracy Perez	
Miss Photogenic	#38 – Kathleen Joy Paton	
Best in Evening Gown	#25 – Danica Dilla	

== Fast Track Events ==
The winner of each fast track event will automatically advance to Top 24 of Miss World Philippines 2021.

Fast Track	Winner	Finalists	Ref.
Beauty With A Purpose	#3 – Joy Barcoma	#1 – Lea Macapagal; #2 – Ria Angelique Siozon; #3 – Joy May Anne Barcoma; #9 – Ambriel Pascual; #19 – Asha Gutierrez; #22 – Dindi Pajares; #27 – Trisha Martinez; #29 – Ann Palmares; #43 – Ganiel Krishnan	
Goodwill	#41 – Samela Godin	#5 – Pauline Robles; #18 – Tatyana Austria; #22 – Dindi Pajares; #26 – Jo-Ann Dela Torre Flores; #32 – Divina Marie Villanueva; #41 - Samela Godin; #43 – Ganiel Krishnan	
Head to Head Challenge	#8 – Emmanuelle Vera	#8 – Emmanuelle Vera; #36 – Tracy Perez	
Multimedia Challenge	#43 – Ganiel Krishnan	#1 – Lea Macapagal; #4 – Janelle Lewis; #23 – Shannen Manzano; #25 – Danica Dilla; #33 – Reziah Angelica Famorcan; #37 – Rachel Anne Valera; #41 – Samela Godin; #43 – Ganiel Krishnan; #44 – Sherenade Gonzales; #45 – Esel Ponce	
Top Model	#27 – Trisha Martinez	#4 – Janelle Lewis; #8 – Emmanuelle Vera; #10 – Michelle Arceo; #19 – Asha Gutierrez; #22 – Dindi Pajares; #24 – Andrea Sulangi; #27 - Trisha Martinez; #36 – Tracy Perez; #38 – Kathleen Joy Paton; #43 – Ganiel Krishnan	
Beach Beauty	#31 – Riana Agatha Pangindian	#4 – Janelle Lewis; #8 – Emmanuelle Vera; #10 – Michelle Arceo; #13 – Sade Nicha; #19 – Asha Gutierrez; #22 – Dindi Pajares; #31 – Riana Agatha Pangindian; #36 – Tracy Perez; #38 – Kathleen Joy Paton; #43 – Ganiel Krishnan	
National Costume	#29 – Ann Palmares	#8 – Emmanuelle Vera; #12 – Natasha Jung; #19 – Asha Gutierrez; #22 – Dindi Pajares; #23 – Shannen Manzano; #24 – Andrea Sulangi; #29 – Ann Palmares; #30 – Julie Tarrayo; #36 – Tracy Perez; #43 – Ganiel Krishnan	
Talent	#10 – Michelle Arceo	#1 – Lea Macapagal; #6 – Shaila Rebortera; #8 – Emmanuelle Vera; #10 – Michelle Arceo; #13 – Sade Nicha; #17 – Dannah Tempra; #23 – Shannen Manzano; #25 – Danica Dilla; #42 – Mara Ruiz; #45 – Esel Ponce	
Charity by Teviant	#43 – Ganiel Krishnan	#3 – Joy Barcoma; #4 – Janelle Lewis; #13 – Sade Nicha; #16 – Anne De Mesa; #20 – Kyle Celine Dorado; #22 – Dindi Pajares; #28 – Ruffa Nava; #35 – Mary Rose Guiral; #41 – Samela Godin; #43 – Ganiel Krishnan	
Sports Challenge	#17 – Dannah Joy Tempra	#8 – Emmanuelle Vera; #10 – Michelle Arceo; #17 – Dannah Joy Tempra; #19 – Asha Gutierrez; #25 – Danica Theresa Dilla; #30 – Julie Tarrayo; #31 – Riana Agatha Pangindian; #35 – Mary Rose Guiral; #38 – Kathleen Joy Paton; #40 – Dane Mayo	

== Contestants ==
44 delegates competed for the eight titles.

No.	Contestant	Age	Province/City
1	Lea Macapagal	24	Dinalupihan
2	Ria Angelique Siozon	24	Meycauayan
3	Joy Barcoma	22	Mandaluyong
4	Janelle Lewis	19	Angeles
6	Shaila Mae Rebortera	25	Cebu
7	Donna Marie Balaoro	28	Cavite
8	Emmanuelle Vera	26	Province of Cebu/Taguig
9	Ambriel Pascual	20	Manila
10	Michelle Arceo	23	Quezon City
11	Megan Deen Campbell	23	Lapu-Lapu
12	Natasha Jung	18	Tacloban
13	Sade Nicha	22	Muntinlupa
14	Gwendolyne Fourniol	21	Himamaylan
15	Mikaela Leonardo	25	Parañaque
16	Anne De Mesa	22	Batangas City
17	Dannah Joy Tempra	19	Misamis Oriental
18	Tatyana Alexi Austria	18	Parañaque
19	Asha Gutierrez	26	Taguig
20	Kyle Celine Dorado	19	Mabalacat
21	Kim Babao	25	Oriental Mindoro
22	Dindi Joy Pajares	28	Orani
23	Shannen Manzano	17	General Santos/Quezon City
24	Andrea Sulangi	25	Morong, Bataan
25	Danica Dilla	26	Iriga
26	Jo-Ann Flores	28	Laguna
27	Trisha Martinez	23	Pila, Laguna
28	Ruffa Nava	28	Batangas
29	Ann Palmares	22	Iloilo City
30	Julie Tarrayo	25	Northern Samar
31	Riana Agatha Pangindian	24	Pasig
32	Divina Marie Villanueva	24	La Union
33	Reziah Angelica Famorcan	23	Lubao
34	Maricollin Ramirez	28	Quezon
35	Mary Rose Guiral	20	Naic
36	Tracy Perez	28	Cebu City
37	Rachel Anne Valera	28	Bukidnon
38	Kathleen Joy Paton	24	Aklan
39	Kimberly Cimafranca	26	Negros Oriental
40	Danielle Mayo	26	Tanauan, Batangas
41	Samela Godin	23	Samar
42	Mara Ruiz	27	Bohol
43	Ganiel Krishnan	27	Kawit
44	Sherenade Gonzales	21	San Rafael, Bulacan
45	Esel Ponce	25	Iligan

=== Withdrawals ===
- Pauline Robles of San Pablo, Laguna
