= Miss Tourism Worldwide =

International beauty pageant

- Type: International women's beauty pageant
- Parent organization: Lumiere International
- Headquarters: Singapore
- First edition: 2018
- Most recent edition: 2026
- Current titleholder: Anne De Mesa; Philippines
- President and owner: Justina Tan Quek
- Language: English
- Website: Official website

Miss Tourism Worldwide is an annual international beauty pageant run and owned by Singapore-based Lumiere International Pte. Ltd.

The current Miss Tourism Worldwide is Anne De Mesa from the Philippines. She was crowned on April 25, 2026, at the Forest City Marina Resort in Johor Bahru, Malaysia.

== History ==
Miss Tourism Worldwide is a pageant that aims to promote tourism, cultural exchange, and global goodwill. The pageant was founded by Justina Tan Quek and was first held in 2018 at Indonesia.

== Titleholders ==
Edition	Year	Miss Tourism Worldwide	Runners-up				Date	Host	Entrants	Ref
Edition	Year	Miss Tourism Worldwide	First	Second	Third	Fourth	Date	Host	Entrants	Ref
1st	2018	Philippines; Zara Carbonell	Thailand; Phacharanan Thiranithitnan	South Africa; Zabelo Hlabisa	France; Cassandra Delanchy	Siberia; Perkarskaia Natalya	9 September	Indonesia	21	
2nd	2019	Curacao; Mariana Pietersz	China; Dorothy Cheung	Thailand; Inky Nicha	Russia; Maria Dorokhova	Japan; Niki Sakamoto	22 September	Indonesia	29	
2020 — 2024		No Pageant Held								
3rd	2025	Benelux; Joyce Tuijaerts	New Zealand; Kiara O'Leary	China; Xu Yan Xi	Russia; Sofya Tsymlyanskaya	Portugal; Vania Priscila	15 March	Singapore	24	
4th	2026	Philippines; Anne De Mesa	Cameroon; Kuma Ruth Ndain	Estonia; Geili Meigas	Belgium; Milana Roothooft	Thailand; Pakjira Kusolthipjaroen	25 April	Malaysia	21	

=== Country by number of wins ===
Country/Territory	Titles	Winning years
Philippines	2	2018, 2026
Curacao	1	2019
Benelux	1	2025
