= Tracy Perez =

Filipina model, industrial engineer, and beauty pageant titleholder

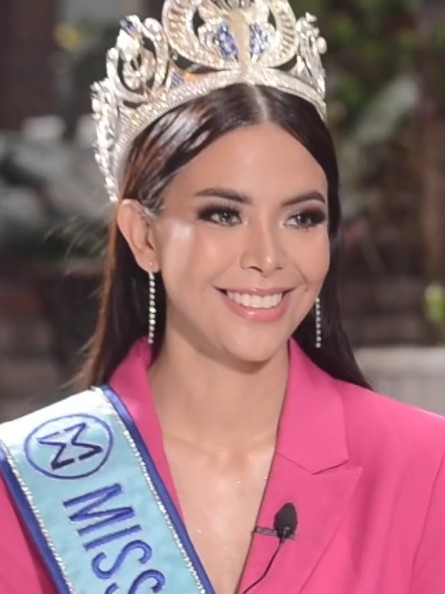
- Perez in 2021
- Born: Tracy Maureen Perez; March 23, 1993 (age 33); Cebu City, Philippines
- Alma mater: University of San Carlos (Industrial engineering)
- Height: 1.67 m (5 ft 6 in)
- Beauty pageant titleholder
- Title: Miss World Philippines 2021
- Hair color: Brown
- Eye color: Hazel
- Major competitions: Miss World Philippines 2019; (Top 12); Miss Universe Philippines 2020; (Top 16); Miss World Philippines 2021; (Winner); Miss World 2021; (Top 13)

Tracy Maureen Perez (Tagalog: [ˈtɾeɪsi maʊˈɾin ˈpɛrɛs]; born March 23, 1993) is a Filipina beauty pageant titleholder who was crowned Miss World Philippines 2021. She represented the Philippines at the Miss World 2021 pageant in San Juan, Puerto Rico and finished as a top 13 semifinalist.

== Early life and education ==
Tracy Maureen Perez was born on March 23, 1993, in Cebu City, Philippines.

Perez graduated from the University of San Carlos with a degree in Industrial engineering.

== Pageantry ==
=== Miss World Philippines 2019 ===
Perez entered Miss World Philippines 2019 as her first national pageant. She reached the top 12, with Michelle Dee winning the contest.

=== Miss Universe Philippines 2020 ===
Perez competed in Miss Universe Philippines 2020. She reached the top 16, with Rabiya Mateo of Iloilo City winning the contest.

=== Miss World Philippines 2021 ===
In October 2021, Perez competed at Miss World Philippines 2021 for the second time, and won. During the coronation night, she slipped on the edge of the platform after fixing her stance and fell down the stairs of the stage before the announcing of winners. Then she fell a second time shortly after she was crowned, during her first walk as the reigning queen, causing her crown to slip from her head. Perez competed at the Miss World 2021 pageant in Puerto Rico in December 2021.

=== Miss World 2021 ===
Perez entered Miss World 2021, reaching the top 13, with Karolina Bielawska of Poland winning the contest. Perez won the Miss World 2021 head-to-head challenge and Beauty with a purpose Top 6 finalist, which secured a spot in the semifinals. She wore a national costume inspired by the goddess Mayari, for the Dances of the World segment on finals night.

== Filmography ==
Year	Title	Role	Note(s)	Ref(s).
TBA	Kuya: The Governor Edwin Jubahib Story		In production	

Preceded by Michelle Dee (Makati)	Miss World Philippines; 2021	Succeeded by Gwendolyne Fourniol (Negros Occidental)
