= Miss Grand Philippines 2025 =

4th Miss Grand Philippines pageant

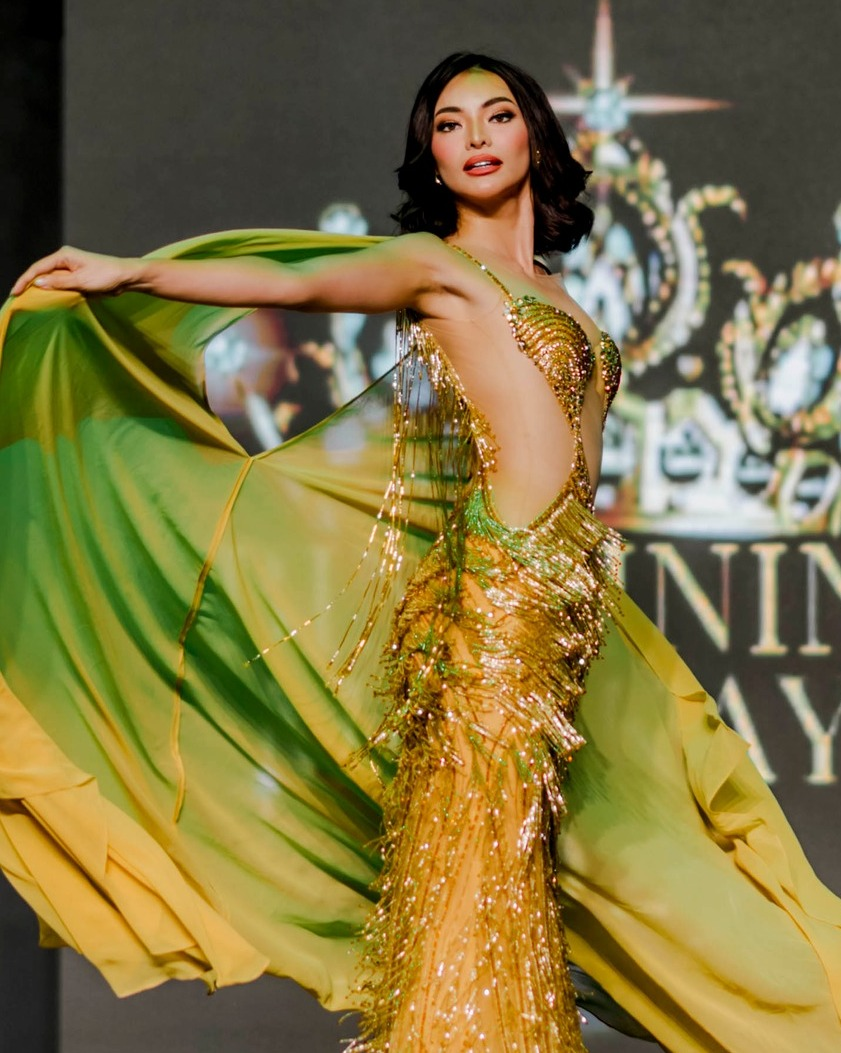
- Emma Tiglao
- Date: August 24, 2025
- Entertainment: One Verse; Dia Maté
- Venue: SM Mall of Asia Arena, Pasay, Metro Manila
- Broadcaster: Youtube
- Entrants: 29
- Placements: 15
- Withdrawals: Koronadal
- Winner: Emma Tiglao, Pampanga
- Best National Costume: Nikki Buenafe Cheveh; Quezon City
- Photogenic: Emma Tiglao; Pampanga

Miss Grand Philippines 2025 was the fourth Miss Grand Philippines pageant, held on August 24, 2025, at the SM Mall of Asia Arena in Pasay, Philippines. Twenty-nine contestants competed for the titles.

CJ Opiaza of Castillejos crowned Emma Tiglao of Pampanga as her successor. She represented the Philippines and was crowned as the winner of Miss Grand International 2025 pageant held on October 18, 2025, in Bangkok, Thailand.

In addition to the Miss Grand International title, the country's representatives for other international pageants were named during the event.

== Background ==
=== Selection of contestants ===
The Miss Grand Philippines organizer, ALV Pageant Circle, announced on March 11, 2025, that applications for the 2025 pageant are officially available, with the deadline for submissions on May 12 and final screening scheduled for May 24. Some contestants were chosen through different regional pageants affiliated with ALV Pageant Circle, namely the two delegates from Quezon City (the 2 winners of Miss World Quezon City, Solaire Rallos and Dianne Cabatulan which the latter later represented Valenzuela), Pangasinan (Angelica Joy Flores), Quezon Province (Dawn Andreinette Salas), Laguna (Irish Anne Parto), including Batangas representative (Bea Mae Sumulong) who earned the Miss Grand province title in that province's local contest for Miss World Philippines 2025. The first batch of 27 contestants was announced on 24 May, and the remaining were later revealed in the sashing ceremony held on 1 July.

=== Withdrawals, substitutes, and additions ===
On May 24, 2025, 27 candidates out of the 32 official delegates were presented on the final screening at the Glass Ballroom at Okada Manila and at their FB page. The composed 27 included Koronadal (Freezle Juana Verzo), Pampanga (Rena Marie Flores) and Quezon City (Solaire Rallos). Along with, Nikki Buenafe Cheveh originally was the second representative of Pangasinan during the announcement. The remaining five were to be divulged at the Presentation of Delegates on July 1, 2025.

On July 1, 2025, the Presentation of Delegates commenced at the Golden Ballroom of Okada Manila with 29 officially proclaimed. Three of the previous candidates withdrew namely Koronadal (Freezle Juana Verzo), Pampanga (Rena Marie Flores), and Quezon City (Solaire Rallos). Nikki Buenafe Cheveh of Pangasinan took over Solaire Rallos' relinguished spot for Quezon City. Five new delegates were added in the roster namely: Francesca Beatriz McLelland (Aklan), Shanon Tampon (Bulacan), Jasmine Garner (Filipino Community in Canada), Alyssa Geronimo (Nueva Ecija), and Emma Mary Tiglao (Pampanga who took over Rena Marie Flores' vacated spot).

=== Location and date ===
On July 7, 2025, the organizers announced that the pageant will be held on August 12, 2025, at the SM Mall of Asia Arena in Pasay. On August 1, 2025, the organizers announced on Instagram that the pageant date was moved to August 24, 2025, due to recent calamities.

=== Preliminary ===
The Charity Gala and Preliminary Competition was held on August 17, 2025, at the Grand Ballroom of Okada Manila, Parañaque City.

== Results ==
=== Placements ===
Placement	Contestant	International Placement
Miss Grand Philippines 2025	Pampanga – Emma Tiglao	Winner – Miss Grand International 2025
Miss Asia Pacific International Philippines 2025	Zambales – Anita Gomez	1st Runner-Up – Miss Asia Pacific International 2025
Face of Beauty International Philippines 2025	Quezon City – Nikki Buenafe Cheveh	Winner – Face of Beauty International 2025
Reina Hispanoamericana Filipinas 2025	Aklan – Francesca Beatriz Mclelland	Top 13 – Reina Hispanoamericana 2026
Miss Tourism International Philippines 2026	Taguig – Michelle Arceo	TBD – Miss Tourism International 2026
1st Runner-Up	Bicol Region – Margarette Briton	Winner – Miss Interglobal 2026
2nd Runner-Up	Rizal – Beatriz Angela Ocampo	2nd Runner-Up – Face of Beauty International 2026
Top 15	Alabang – Chelsea Joy Arciaga §; Bamban – Sophia Francine Barles; Bulacan – Shanon Tampon; Canada – Jasmine Garner; Davao Region – Angeleyh Pasco; Ilocos Region – Angel Louise Dolor §; Quezon – Dawn Andreinette Salas; Tarlac – Mary Rose Grande	

§ – Voted into the Top 15 by viewers as Miss Popular Vote

==== Major awards ====
Award	Contestant
Best in Evening Gown	Pampanga – Emma Tiglao
Best in Swimsuit	Pampanga – Emma Tiglao
Miss Photogenic	Pampanga – Emma Tiglao
Best in National Costume	Quezon City – Nikhisah Buenafe Cheveh
Miss Charity	Aklan – Francesca Beatriz McLelland; Pampanga – Emma Tiglao
Miss Grand Voice	Taguig – Michelle Arceo
Miss Popular Vote	Alabang – Chelsea Joy Arciaga; Ilocos Region – Angel Louise Dolor

== Contestants ==
The official candidates were announced and sashed on July 1. The following contestants will compete for the title.

Miss Grand Philippines 2025 competition results by province and region
Color key:
Main winner	Supplemental winners
1st runner-up	2nd runner-up
Top 15	Unplaced
Withdrew	No representative

Locality	Contestant
Aklan	Francesca Beatriz McLelland
Alabang	Chelsea Joy Arciaga
Bamban	Sophia Francine Barles
Bataan	Manilyn De Guzman
Batangas	Bea Mae Sumulong
Bicol Region	Margarette Briton
Bulacan	Shanon Tampon
Caloocan	Arianne Villareal
Davao Region	Angeleyh Pasco
Canada	Jasmine Garner
Ilocos Region	Angel Louise Dolor
Ilocos Sur	Princess Tacazon
Ipil	Princess Jannah Alabata
Laguna	Irish Anne Parto
Muntinlupa	Anne Maureen Pasco
Nueva Ecija	Alyssa Geronimo
Occidental Mindoro	Mary Joy Suarez
Pampanga	Emma Mary Tiglao
Pangasinan	Angelica Joy Flores
Paranaque	Babylyn Namo
Quezon	Dawn Andreinette Salas
Quezon City	Nikhisah Buenafe Cheveh
Rizal	Beatriz Angela Ocampo
Samar	Carla Jane Turcido
Taguig	Michelle Arceo
Tanay	Rona Rabina
Tarlac	Mary Rose Grande
Valenzuela	Dianne Cabatulan
Zambales	Anita Rose Gomez
