= Jeanne Isabelle Bilasano =

Filipino beauty queen and speech-language pathologist

- Born: Jeanne Isabelle Bilasano; Malilipot, Albay Bicol Region, Philippines
- Occupation: Speech-language pathologist
- Awards: Best in National Costume (Binibining Pilipinas 2023); Best in National Costume; Best in Swimsuit; Best in Evening Gown; People's Choice Award (Face of Beauty International 2024)
- Beauty pageant titleholder
- Title: Face of Beauty Philippines 2024; Face of Beauty International 2024
- Major competitions: Binibining Pilipinas 2023; (Top 11); Miss World Philippines 2024; (Finalist); Face of Beauty International 2024; (Winner)

Jeanne Isabelle Bilasano is a Filipino beauty queen and speech-language pathologist who was crowned Face of Beauty International 2024. She became the first representative of the Philippines to win the international pageant, held in Kaohsiung, Taiwan. She also competed in Binibining Pilipinas 2023 and Miss World Philippines 2024.

== Early life and career ==
Bilasano is from Albay in the Bicol Region of the Philippines. Before winning an international pageant title, she worked as a speech-language pathologist, providing services to patients with neurological and cardiovascular conditions, as well as younger patients receiving home-based therapy.

== Pageantry ==
=== Binibining Pilipinas 2023 ===
Bilasano competed in Binibining Pilipinas 2023, where she received the Best in National Costume award for a costume inspired by Mayon Volcano.

=== Miss World Philippines 2024 ===
In July 2024, Bilasano competed in Miss World Philippines 2024, representing the Bicol Region. She was named Face of Beauty Philippines 2024 after the competition's final round and received one of the pageant's Beauty with a Purpose project distinctions.

=== Face of Beauty International 2024 ===
Bilasano represented the Philippines at Face of Beauty International 2024, held in Kaohsiung, Taiwan, in September 2024. She won the international title, becoming the first Filipina to do so. Her placement marked the Philippines' first victory in the pageant.

She also won the Best in National Costume, Best in Swimsuit, Best in Evening Gown and People's Choice awards. The other main finalists were Anita Wang of Taiwan, Stephanie Fernandez of Colombia, Sabne Lata Mailei of Tonga and Warunchana Radomlek of Thailand.

Following her victory, Bilasano returned to the Philippines and was welcomed in Albay with a homecoming motorcade. During a subsequent press conference, she spoke about her experience competing internationally and the importance of promoting a broader understanding of beauty. She also discussed the need for more speech-language professionals in the Philippines.

=== Successor ===
In November 2025, Bilasano crowned fellow Filipina Nikki Buenafe as her successor at the Face of Beauty International 2025 competition in Taichung, Taiwan.

== Advocacy ==
During her preparation for the international pageant, Bilasano discussed an advocacy centered on the idea that beauty extends beyond physical appearance and includes the positive impact a person can make in the community. She also highlighted the importance of speech-language therapy and the needs of patients requiring rehabilitation services.

Awards and achievements
Preceded by Kendra Kaing Zar Thant	Face of Beauty International; 2024	Succeeded by Nikki Buenafe Cheveh
Preceded by Janna Eloisa Galan Lanuzga (Libon, Albay)	Face of Beauty Philippines; 2024	Succeeded by Nikki Buenafe Cheveh (Binmaley, Pangasinan)
