= Face of Beauty International 2026 =

12th edition of Face of Beauty International

- Face of Beauty International 2026 edition
- Date: October 30, 2026
- Venue: Taipei, Taiwan
- Entrants: 32
- Placements: 5
- Winner: Pitchayawi Yokoyama; Thailand
- Best National Costume: Beatriz Angela Ocampo; Philippines
- Photogenic: Akari Hmue Paing; Myanmar
- Friendship: Dela Yana Djodji; Togo

Face of Beauty International 2026 was the 12th edition of the Face of Beauty International pageant, held on October 30, 2026, in Taipei, Taiwan. Contestants representing various countries and territories competed for the international title.

At the end of the event, Pitchayawi Yokoyama of Thailand was crowned the winner. Jenna Rintamäki of Finland was named first runner-up, while Beatriz Angela Ocampo of the Philippines finished as second runner-up. Ericka Zayas of the United States and MerryJane Isla Alvarez of Spain placed third and fourth runners-up, respectively.

Yokoyama's victory marked Thailand's third win in the competition, following its previous victories in 2017 and 2019.

== Background ==
The 2026 edition of Face of Beauty International was held in Taiwan from October 23 to November 1, 2026. The competition brought together contestants from nearly 30 countries and territories for a series of activities focused on cultural exchange, community involvement and charitable initiatives.

From October 23 to 27, contestants participated in community and cultural activities in several Taiwanese locations, including Miaoli, Changhua, Hsinchu and Taoyuan. Preliminary competitions, including swimwear and evening gown events, were held on October 28 at the South Garden Hotels and Resorts in Taoyuan. The grand final took place on October 30.

The Philippines was represented by Bea Ocampo, who was appointed following Olivia Grace Reilly's decision to relinquish her national title. Ocampo's participation continued the country's attempt to secure a third consecutive victory after the wins of Jeanne Isabelle Bilasano in 2024 and Nikki Buenafe Cheveh in 2025.

== Results ==
=== Placements ===
Placement	Contestant	Country/Territory	Ref.
Face of Beauty International 2026	Pitchayawi Yokoyama	Thailand	
First runner-up	Jenna Rintamäki	Finland	
Second runner-up	Beatriz Angela Ocampo	Philippines	
Third runner-up	Ericka Zayas	United States	
Fourth runner-up	MerryJane Isla Alvarez	Spain	
Top 15	Georgina Herrero	Argentina	
Top 15	Leylah Walid	Egypt	
Top 15	Karina Uuemaa	Estonia	
Top 15	Marylou Camier	France	
Top 15	Cecilia Dagdagan	Hawaii	
Top 15	Denise Martinez	Honduras	
Top 15	Mirriam Makumba	Zambia	
Top 15	Hajin An	Korea	
Top 15	Bella Chou	Taiwan	
Top 15	Dela Yana Djodji	Togo	

=== Special awards ===
The following special awards were received by Pitchayawi Yokoyama of Thailand during the competition. The pageant presented several special awards recognizing contestants' performances and contributions. The reported recipients included representatives of Thailand, Taiwan, Estonia, Honduras, the Philippines and New Zealand.

Award	Recipient	Country/Territory	Ref.
I AM ME Award	Denise Martinez	Honduras	
Youth I AM ME Award	Karina Uuemaa	Estonia	
Asia Continental Queen	Zhou Haoyue (周皓月)	Taiwan	
Charity Ambassador	Zhou Haoyue (周皓月)	Taiwan	
Best in Talent	Zhou Haoyue (周皓月)	Taiwan	
Best in Swimwear	Pitchayawi Yokoyama	Thailand	
2nd place – Best in Evening Gown	Pitchayawi Yokoyama	Thailand	
2nd place – Best in National Costume	Pitchayawi Yokoyama	Thailand	
Charity Ambassador	Pitchayawi Yokoyama	Thailand	
Best in National Costume	Beatriz "Bea" Ocampo	Philippines	
3rd place – Best in National Costume	Celene Martin	New Zealand	

== Contestants ==
The official pageant website published a candidates page for the 2026 edition. A total of 32 candidates were listed on the online voting platform for the 2026 edition, representing countries and territories from around the world.

No.	Contestant	Country/Territory	Ref.
1	Georgina Herrero	Argentina	
2	Kadija Bah	Australia	
3	Olga Bezdetko	Belarus	
4	Lotte Theunckens	Belgium	
5	Charlyn Corona	Dominican Republic	
6	Leylah Walid	Egypt	
7	Karina Uuemaa	Estonia	
8	Jenna Rintamäki	Finland	
9	Marylou Camier	France	
10	Cecilia Dagdagan	Hawaii, United States	
11	Denise Martinez	Honduras	
12	Yuki Itabashi	Japan	
13	Hajin An	South Korea	
14	Vinisyhaa Vijayan	Malaysia	
15	Akari Hmue Paing	Myanmar	
16	Noemi Leep	Netherlands	
17	Celene Martin	New Zealand	
18	Beatriz Angela Ocampo	Philippines	
19	Rafaela Do Rosario	Portugal	
20	Dana Gross	Réunion	
21	Aliia Ondar	Russia	
22	Jas Lim	Singapore	
23	MerryJane Isla Alvarez	Spain	
24	Sarah Asteroth	Switzerland	
25	Vaite Mamatui	Tahiti	
26	Bella Chou	Taiwan	
27	Pitchayawi Yokoyama	Thailand	
28	Dela Yana Djodji	Togo	
29	Anitiveniana Talia Uli	Tonga	
30	Chada Chehoud	Tunisia	
31	Ericka Joyce Zayas	United States	
32	Mirriam Makumba	Zambia	
