= Mutya ng Pilipinas 2016 =

Beauty pageant edition

- Date: July 30, 2016
- Presenters: Richard Gutierrez; Bela Padilla; Arci Muñoz
- Venue: Newport Performing Arts Theater, Resorts World Manila, Pasay, Philippines
- Broadcaster: ABS-CBN
- Entrants: 30
- Placements: 10
- Winner: Ganiel Krishnan; Manila
- Photogenic: Jannie Loudette Alipo-on; Navotas

Mutya ng Pilipinas 2016 was the 48th Mutya ng Pilipinas pageant, held at the Newport Performing Arts Theater, Resorts World Manila in Pasay, Metro Manila, Philippines, on July 30, 2016.

At the end of the event, Leren Mae Bautista crowned Ganiel Krishnan as Mutya ng Pilipinas Asia Pacific International 2016. Including her crowned are the new court of winners: Justin Mae San Jose was crowned as Mutya ng Pilipinas Tourism International 2016, and Michelle Thorlund was crowned as Mutya ng Pilipinas Overseas Communities 2016. Lynette Bradford was named First Runner-Up, while Ashley Nicole Singh was named Second Runner-Up.

== Results ==
=== Placements ===
Color keys

- The contestant was a Runner-up in an International pageant.
- The contestant was a Semi-Finalist in an International pageant.
- The contestant did not place.

Placement	Contestant	International placement
Mutya ng Pilipinas Asia Pacific International 2016	Mutya #28 – Ganiel Akrisha Krishnan	2nd Runner-Up – Miss Asia Pacific International 2016
Mutya ng Pilipinas Tourism International 2016	Mutya #26 – Justin Mae San Jose	Unplaced – Miss Tourism International 2016
Mutya ng Pilipinas Overseas Communities 2016	Mutya #10 – Michelle Thorlund	
1st Runner-Up	Mutya #1 – Lynette Bradford	
2nd Runner-Up	Mutya #30 – Ashley Nicole Singh	Top 10 – Miss Tourism Queen of the Year International 2016
Top 10	Mutya #2 – Joanna Rose Tolledo; Mutya #4 – Jannie Loudette Alipo-on; Mutya #12 – Marielle Cartagena; Mutya #13 – Mayu Murakami; Mutya #21 – Dianne Irish Joy Lacayanga	

== Special awards ==
=== Major Awards ===
Results	Contestant	Ref.
People's Choice Award	Mutya #7 Davao City - Thalia Coronico	
Best in Terno	Mutya #30 Nueva Ecija - Ashley Nicole Singh	
Best in Evening Gown	Mutya #26 Calabarzon - Justin Mae San Jose	
Miss Photogenic by Lito Sy	Mutya #4 Navotas - Jannie Loudette Alipo-on	
Best in Talent	Mutya #28 Manila - Ganiel Krishnan	
Best in Swimsuit	Mutya #26 Calabarzon - Justin Mae San Jose	
Darling of the Press	Mutya #28 Manila - Ganiel Krishnan	
Best in Long Gown	Mutya #26 Calabarzon - Justin Mae San Jose	

=== Sponsor Awards ===
Results	Contestant	Ref.
Mutya ng Skyjet Airlines	Mutya #26 Calabarzon - Justin Mae San Jose	
Mutya ng Rain or Shine	Mutya #28 Manila - Ganiel Krishnan	
Mutya ng Sheridan	Mutya #28 Manila - Ganiel Krishnan	
Mutya ng Hannah's Beach Resort	Mutya #22 Batangas - Rianne Charlotte Kalaw	
Mutya ng Mags	Mutya #28 Manila - Ganiel Krishnan	
Mutya ng Cynas	Mutya #4 Navotas - Jannie Loudette Alipo-on	
Miss Viva Discovery	Mutya #30 Nueva Ecija - Ashley Nicole Singh	
Mutya ng Resorts World Manila	Mutya #4 Navotas - Jannie Loudette Alipo-on	
Mutya ng Hotel 101	Mutya #28 Manila - Ganiel Krishnan	
Mutya ng Camera Club of the Philippines	Mutya #28 Manila - Ganiel Krishnan	
Mutya ng Inglot	Mutya #28 Manila - Ganiel Krishnan	

== Contestants ==
30 contestants competed for the three titles:

No.	Contestant	Age	Hometown
1	Lynette Bradford	19	Melbourne
2	Joanna Rose Tolledo	22	Caloocan
3	Cassandra Costales McDonald	20	Australia
4	Jannie Loudette Alipo-on	24	Navotas
5	Marah Muñoz	23	Parañaque
6	Jessica Jane Morales	21	Pasig
7	Thalia Joyce Coronico	19	Davao City
8	Rose Ann de Jesus	21	Concepcion
9	Joanna Marie Rabe	21	Zambales
10	Michelle Thorlund	19	California
11	Rhancoise Marie Mayangitan	20	Pampanga
12	Marielle Cartagena	20	Cebu City
13	Mayu Murakami	22	Japan
14	Rdelyn de Leon	24	Aurora
15	Ann Lauren Ose	19	Scandinavia
16	Maeryhnella Umayam	19	United Kingdom
17	Petche Ann Vale	20	Bohol
18	Angela Yagaya	19	Western Visayas
19	Neliza Bautista	19	Northern Mindanao
20	Jurice Encarnacion	20	Canada
21	Dianne Irish Joy Lacayanga	18	Paniqui
22	Rianne Charlotte Kalaw	18	Batangas
23	Kristen Karla de la Cruz	19	Zamboanga City
24	Ace Dianne Morales	23	Bataan
25	Mary Therese Erna Gomez	24	Tarlac
26	Justin Mae San Jose	19	Calabarzon
27	Marie Joyce Marfori	19	Mabalacat
28	Ganiel Akrisha Krishnan	21	Manila
29	Renelyn Deguit	18	Negros Island
30	Ashley Nicole Singh	21	Central Luzon
