= Miss Asia Pacific International =

Beauty pageant in Manila, Philippines

- Formation: 4 December 1965; 60 years ago
- Headquarters: Manila
- Location: Philippines
- Official language: English
- President: Eva Patalinjug
- General Manager: Kristine Caballero Aplal
- International Affairs Director: Onin Mas
- Website: www.asiapacificintl.com
- Formerly called: Miss Asia; Miss Asia Quest; Miss Asia Pacific

Miss Asia Pacific International is an international beauty pageant, based in Manila, Philippines. It was founded in 1965 as Miss Asia and later renamed Miss Asia Pacific in 1984, followed by Miss Asia Pacific Quest in 1985 when Latin American and Pacific countries were included. In 2005, it was renamed to its current title, Miss Asia Pacific International.

The 2026 titleholder is Sasiwararin Atsawahirankarn of Thailand.

== History ==
The pageant was established in 1965 as the Miss Asia contest. The first winner was Angela Filmer from Malaysia. She was crowned by incoming first lady Imelda Marcos on December 4, 1965. The initial edition of the contest included participants from 18 countries.

Its name was changed to Miss Asia Pacific in 1984 and Miss Asia Pacific Quest in 1985 when participants from the Americas and the Pacific region were included. In 2005, it was renamed Miss Asia Pacific International to allow participants from all countries. It was not held in 1990 due to the Luzon earthquake, in 1991 due to the Mount Pinatubo eruption, in 2004, from 2006 to 2015, and from 2020 to 2023.

In 2005, Leonora Jimenez Monge from Costa Rica was removed after participating in the Miss World contest. Her title then passed to the first runner-up, Yevgeniya Lapova from Russia. The pageant was then suspended after the conclusion of the 2005 edition. It resumed in 2016, with Tessa le Conge from the Netherlands as the winner.

The last titleholder before the COVID-19 pandemic was Chaiyenne Huisman from Spain, who won on October 9, 2019.

Due to restrictions from the COVID-19 pandemic, no competition was held from 2020 to 2023. It returned in October 2024, with Eva Patalinjug as the new president and Kristine Caballero-Aplal as General Manager.

== Titleholders ==
Year	Edition	Country/Territory	Miss Asia Pacific International	Location	Entrants	Ref.
1965	1st	Malaysia	Angela Filmer	Manila City, Metro Manila, Philippines	18	
1968	2nd	Taiwan	Macy Shih	Quezon City, Metro Manila, Philippines	12	
1969	3rd	South Korea	Seo Won-kyoung	Quezon City, Metro Manila, Philippines	13	
1970	4th	India	Zeenat Aman	Quezon City, Metro Manila, Philippines	15	
1971	5th	Guam	Flora Baza	Quezon City, Metro Manila, Philippines	15	
1972	6th	Australia	Janet Coutts	Quezon City, Metro Manila, Philippines	14	
1973	7th	India	Tara Anne Fonseca	Manila City, Metro Manila, Philippines	14	
1974	8th	Australia	Susie Currie	Manila City, Metro Manila, Philippines	16	
1975	9th	Papua New Guinea	Eva Regina Arni	Manila City, Metro Manila, Philippines	18	
1976	10th	Singapore	Jacqueline Stuart	Manila City, Metro Manila, Philippines	17	
1977	11th	Indonesia	Linda Emran	Manila City, Metro Manila, Philippines	17	
1978	12th	Thailand	Siriporn Savanglum	Manila City, Metro Manila, Philippines	15	
1979	13th	Turkey	Ayla Altas	Manila City, Metro Manila, Philippines	15	
1980	14th	Australia	Lorraine Gaye McGrady	Manila City, Metro Manila, Philippines	16	
1981	15th	Sri Lanka	Bernadine Rose Ramanayake	Kuala Lumpur City, Greater Kuala Lumpur, Malaysia	16	
1982	16th	Philippines	Maria del Carmen Ines Zaragoza	Kuala Lumpur City, Greater Kuala Lumpur, Malaysia	14	
1983	17th	Philippines	Gloria Dimayacyac	Manila City, Metro Manila, Philippines	14	
1984	18th	Turkey	Melek Gurkan	Christchurch, Canterbury, New Zealand	19	
1985	19th	Israel	Nurit Mizrachi	Wan Chai, British Hong Kong	31	
1986	20th	New Zealand	Helen Mary Crawford	Hung Hom, British Hong Kong	32	
1987	21st	Panama	Cilinia Prada	Wanchai, British Hong Kong	30	
1988	22nd	Thailand	Preeyanuch Panpradub	Hung Hom, British Hong Kong	32	
1989	23rd	Philippines	Lorna Legaspi	Tsim Sha Tsui, British Hong Kong	31	
1992	24th	Israel	Tali Ben-Harush	Manila City, Metro Manila, Philippines	24	
1993	25th	Philippines	Michelle Aldana	Pasay City, Metro Manila, Philippines	23	
1994	26th	Peru	Jessica Guiulfo Tapia	Cebu City, Cebu, Philippines	26	
1995	27th	South Korea	Yoon Mi-jung	Baguio City, Benguet, Philippines	27	
1996	28th	Costa Rica	Gabriela Aguilar	Subic, Zambales, Philippines	27	
1997	29th	Thailand	Worarat Suwannarat	Davao City, Davao del Sur, Philippines	25	
1998	30th	Costa Rica	Kisha Alvarado	Angeles City, Pampanga, Philippines	25	
1999	31st	Colombia	Juliana Andrea Arango	Quezon City, Metro Manila, Philippines	25	
2000	32nd	India	Diya Mirza Handrich	Quezon City, Metro Manila, Philippines	23	
2001	33rd	Peru	Luciana Luisa Farfán	Makati City, Metro Manila, Philippines	19	
2002	34th	South Korea	Kim So-yoon	Manila City, Metro Manila, Philippines	25	
2003	35th	Russia	Tatyana Nikitina	Pasay City, Metro Manila, Philippines	25	
2005	36th	Costa Rica	Leonora Jiménez (Dethroned)	Guangzhou, China	51	
2005	36th	Russia	Yevgeniya Lapova (Assumed)	Guangzhou, China	51	
2016	37th	Netherlands	Tessa Helena le Conge	Puerto Princesa City, Palawan, Philippines	40	
2017	38th	Brazil	Francielly Ouriques	Pasay City, Metro Manila, Philippines	42	
2018	39th	Philippines	Sharifa Akeel	Pasay City, Metro Manila, Philippines	51	
2019	40th	Spain	Chaiyenne Huisman	Pasay City, Metro Manila, Philippines	54	
2024	41st	United States	Janelis Leyba	Pasay City, Metro Manila, Philippines	33	
2025	42nd	Brazil	Isabela Fernandes	Cebu City, Cebu, Philippines	43	
2026	43rd	Thailand	Sasiwararin Atsawahirankarn	Lapu-Lapu City, Cebu, Philippines	38	

Countries/Territories by number of wins
Countries/Territories	Titles	Year(s)
Philippines	5	1982, 1983, 1989, 1993, 2018
Thailand	4	1978, 1988, 1997, 2026
South Korea	3	1969, 1995, 2002
India	3	1970, 1973, 2000
Costa Rica	3	1996, 1998, 2005^{A}
Australia	3	1972, 1974, 1980
Brazil	2	2017, 2025
Peru	2	1994, 2001
Turkey	2	1979, 1984
Russia	2	2003, 2005^{B}
Israel	2	1985, 1992
United States	1	2024
Spain	1	2019
Netherlands	1	2016
Colombia	1	1999
Panama	1	1987
New Zealand	1	1986
Sri Lanka	1	1981
Indonesia	1	1977
Singapore	1	1976
Papua New Guinea	1	1975
Guam	1	1971
Taiwan	1	1968
Malaysia	1	1965

== List of runner-ups ==
Year	Runners-up			
Year	First	Second	Third	Fourth
1965	Ester Cheryl da Silva; Ceylon	Resurreccion Vianzon; Philippines	Not awarded	
1968	Cassandra Stiles; Australia	Atsumi Ikeno; Japan	Jane Mozo de Goya; Philippines	Valisra Trungvachirachi; Thailand
1969	Shirley Sha; Taiwan	Sandra Jacqueline Van Geyzel; Malaysia	Julie Ann Hodge; Australia	Frances Margaret Carrick; New Zealand
1970	Alice Tiongson Crisostomo; Philippines	Yvonne Haunani Young; Hawaii	Carolyn Dartnell; Australia	Geraldine Welford; New Zealand
1971	Carolyn Gomara Masibay; Philippines	Hong Jung Ja; Korea	Gayah Tehetchik; Israel	Sandra Van Loon; Australia
1972	Yvette Marie Alfon; Philippines	Dorit Bar; Israel	Vivienne Hamilton; New Zealand	Srungya Krachangsuk; Thailand
1973	Nehama Fass; Israel	Lely Herawati Soendoro; Indonesia	Chung Kum Ok; Korea	Deborah Seccounbe; Australia
1974	Ethel Lau Wai Tak; Hong Kong British Hong Kong	Paripola Penson; Philippines	Liza Sindoro; Indonesia	Debra Josephine De Souza; Singapore
1975	Bernadette Paille; Tahiti	Jane Reilly; Australia	Darlene Schwenkey; Samoa	Linda Kaur; Malaysia
1976	Maea Atger; Tahiti	Anna Adrianne Bredemeyer; India	Anna Luisa Delgado; Philippines	Michelle Ann Glass; Australia
1977	Marianne De Souza; India	Helen Ng; Singapore	Yifat Netzer; Israel	Rio Diaz; Philippines
1978	Epifania Lagman; Philippines	Hannah Ekerling; Israel	Julie Ann Croft; Australia	Hisako Tanaka; Japan
1979	Maureen Mary Lestourgeon; India	Lorraine Espiridon Schuck; Philippines	Lajiah P. R. Sharma; Singapore	Tracy Christopherson; Australia
1980	Rose Maria de Vera; Philippines	Annie Chen Chiau Chuin; Singapore	Cara Pollock; New Zealand	Mina Coldas; Turkey
1981	Kimberly Ann Carey; Guam	Corrine Gail Carvalho; Hawaii	Kang Hae Suk; Korea	Beatrice Hawkins; Malaysia
1982	Rosa Maria Misa; New Zealand	Tippawan Aukkraphun; Thailand	Sharon de Jong; Sri Lanka	Mi Il Kim; Korea
1983	Dorit Kadosh; Israel	Nazan Satchi; Turkey	Joanna Johns; New Zealand	Siriwan Wangwilai; Thailand
1984	Gayle Ann Jones; New Zealand	Elsie Oh Swee Ping; Singapore	Rinat Hadashi; Israel	Suzanne Hoffman; United States
1985	Lin Ji Yeon; Korea	Liliana Tapia Castillo; Peru	Eva Lai; Hong Kong British Hong Kong	Perla Pereira Fruthwirth; Guatemala
1986	Lim Suet Kwee; Singapore	Sararat Rumruangwong; Thailand	Nina Li Chi; Hong Kong British Hong Kong	Nilufer Apaydin; Turkey
1987	Ana Corina Burgos del Rio; Mexico	Toni Jean Frances Peters; Australia	Choi Eun-hee; Korea	Niril Elyovich; Israel
1988	Elsy Guadelupe Aceves Gurrola; Mexico	Revital Mor; Israel	Fatma Anil; Northern Cyprus	Mi Rim Kim; Korea
1989	Myriam Tuheiava; Tahiti	Galit Farber; Israel	Gloria Petrovic; Canada	Anne Seekaew; Thailand
1992	Chutima Nirunsitirat; Thailand	Mutya Laxa; Philippines	Ingrid Matie Mole; New Zealand	Kissarne Watson; Australia
1993	Namrata Shirodkar; India	Monica Reyes; Chile	Maria Teresa Aragon; Mexico	Lavianna Tan Poh Ling; Malaysia
1994	Karla Contreras Estrada; Mexico	Ozlem Mete; Turkey	Nathalie Cohen; Israel	Vaihere Lehartel; Taiwan
1995	Ruchitra Malhotra; India	Hsiao-Ping Chen; Taiwan	Rocio del Pilar Abed; Peru	Previtha Thiyagarajah; Malaysia
1996	Marilyn Maristela; Philippines	Mirna Sommers; Tahiti	Mariel Ocampo; Peru	Kenia Melais; Panama
1997	Divya Chauhan; India	Nancy Veronica Peoma Agnieray; Tahiti	Kerry Anita Lucas; Australia	Gabriela dela Luz de Heeckeren Lagos; Chile
1998	Lourdes Lewis; Panama	Priya Nair; Fiji	Klara Lisy; Australia	Metua Heimoana; Tahiti
1999	Anna Tatarintseva; Russia	Amy Trott; Australia	Wan Wang-Fei; Taiwan	Leanne Catherine Sorby; New Zealand
2000	Marianela Salazar Guillen; Panama	Winter Noel Washington; Australia	Alexandra Maria Rivas; El Salvador	Kanueng-nit In-orng; Thailand
2001	Lisette Villanueva Jiménez; Mexico	Wanvisa Kham-daeng-yai; Thailand	Karol Inés de la Torre Pinilla; Colombia	Darlene Carbungco; Philippines
2002	Ksenia Volkova; Russia	Tina Chhatwal; India	Miriam San Jose Chui; Philippines	Aishwarya Sukhdeo; Fiji
2003	Shonal Rawat; India	Andrea Ovares López; Costa Rica	Tracy Freundt; Peru	Samantha Wong Wye Yeng; Malaysia
2005	Evgeniya Lapova; Russia (Resigned)	Zhang Li Yu; China (Resigned)	Claudia Ortiz de Zevallos; Peru (Resigned)	Jedah Hernandez; Philippines (Resigned)
2005	Zhang Li Yu; China (Assumed)	Claudia Ortiz de Zevallos; Peru (Assumed)	Jedah Hernandez; Philippines (Assumed)	Not awarded
2016	Shawanya Tanhomwong; Thailand	Ganiel Akrisha Atun Krishnan; Philippines	Felicia George; Cook Islands	Kim So-yeon; South Korea
2017	Acacia Walker; New Zealand	Valeria Cardona; Honduras	Morgan Doelwijt; Netherlands	Ilene De Vera; Philippines
2018	Gabriela Palma; Brazil	Melania Gonzales; Costa Rica (Dethroned)	Misheelt Narmandakh; Mongolia (Resigned)	Mariani Nataly Chacón; Venezuela (Resigned)
2018	Gabriela Palma; Brazil	Misheelt Narmandakh; Mongolia (Assumed)	Mariani Nataly Chacón; Venezuela (Assumed)	Raquel Van Gool; Netherlands (Assumed)
2019	Eoanna Constanza; Dominican Republic	Jessica Victoria Cianchino; Canada	Carolina Schuler; Brazil	Fiorella Cortez Arbenz; Costa Rica
2024	Karen Sofia Nuñez; Mexico	Selena Ali; Belgium	Blessa Ericha Figueroa; Philippines	Jennifer Prokop; Germany
2025	Anita Gomez; Philippines	Bowonrat Maneerat; Thailand	Jana Jannsens; Belgium	Elmira Wildeboer; Netherlands
2026	Gia Franchesci; Costa Rica	Nompumelelo Malindi; South Africa	Gabrielle Galapia; Philippines	Itzel Borbón; Mexico

== Continental Queens ==
Edition	Africa	Americas	Asia	Europe	Oceania
2019	Michele-Ange Minkata; Cameroon	Jessica Cianchino; Canada	Klyza Castro; Philippines	Lauralyn Vermeersch; Belgium	Chelsea Martin; New Zealand
2024	Chizuruoke Sufficient Arua; Nigeria	Gabriela De Paiva Padilla; Bolivia	Sophiya Singh; India	Selena Ali; Belgium	Keshia Lee Llarenas; Guam
2025	Bejandri Lourens; South Africa	Michella Whillar; Peru	Aisyah Amini; Indonesia	Elmira Wildeboer; Netherlands	Hannah Cross; New Zealand

== See also ==
- List of beauty pageants
