= Anita Gomez =

Filipino beauty pageant titleholder

Anita Rose Gomez
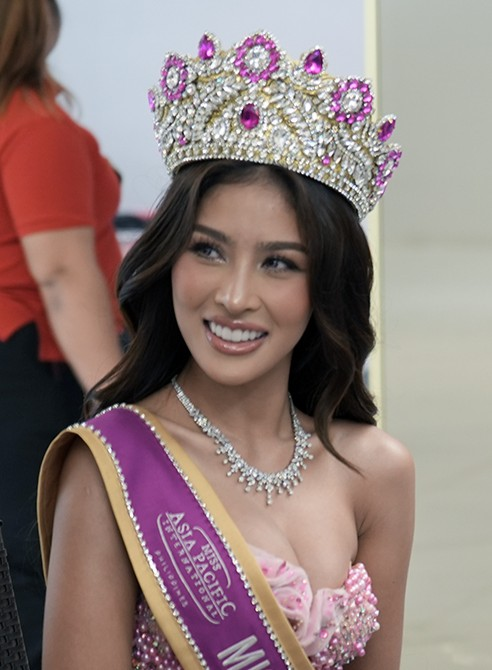
- Gomez in 2025
- Born: Anita Rose Gomez; Zambales, Philippines
- Education: Gordon College (BS)
- Beauty pageant titleholder
- Title: Miss Asia Pacific Philippines 2025
- Major competitions: Miss Fit Philippines 2020; (2nd Runner-up); Miss Philippines Earth 2021; (Unplaced); Miss Universe Philippines 2024; (Top 10); Miss Grand Philippines 2025; (Top 15); (Miss Asia Pacific Philippines 2025); Miss Asia Pacific International 2025; (1st Runner-Up)

Anita Rose Gomez (Note: Tagalog: [aˈnita ros ˈgomes]) is a Filipino model and beauty pageant titleholder who was crowned Miss Asia Pacific Philippines 2025. She represented the Philippines in the Miss Asia Pacific International 2025 competition in Cebu City, Philippines where she finished as first runner-up.

Gomez previously competed at Miss Fit Philippines 2021 where she placed as second runner-up. She then competed at Miss Philippines Earth 2021 where she did not place. She then competed at Miss Universe Philippines 2024 where she finished as a top 10 semifinalist. In 2025, she joined Miss Grand Philippines 2025 where she finished in the top 15 and was crowned Miss Asia Pacific Philippines 2025.

== Early life and education ==
Gomez was born in Zambales. She finished her degree in customs administration from the Gordon College in Olongapo City.

== Pageantry ==
=== Miss Fit Philippines 2020 ===
Gomez entered the inaugural Miss Fit Philippines 2020 competition representing Olongapo City where she finished as second runner-up to Malka Shaver of Dumaguete City.

=== Miss Philippines Earth 2021 ===
On May 25, 2021, Gomez was announced to be one of the 68 delegates competing at Miss Philippines Earth 2021 representing Olongapo City. During the pre-pageant activities, she was awarded a gold medal for the beach wear competition.

Following the conclusion of the virtual pageant held on August 8, 2021, Gomez was unable to secure a placement.

=== Miss Universe Philippines 2024 ===
On February 8, 2024, Gomez was appointed to represent Zambales at the Miss Universe Philippines 2024 competition.

During the preliminary competition held on May 19, 2024, at Manila Hotel's Fiesta Pavilion, Gomez sported a blue-green ombré evening gown designed by Leo Almodal. At the national costume event on April 28, 2024, at the Capitol Grounds and Provincial Sports Complex in Sultan Kudarat, she wore a national costume honoring the Zoobic Safari in Zambales designed by Jomar Peralta.

The coronation night took place on May 22, 2024, at the SM Mall of Asia Arena in Pasay City, where she wore an orange ensemble designed by Almodal for the evening gown segment.

At the end of the event, Gomez finished as a top 10 semifinalist.

=== Miss Grand Philippines 2025 ===
On May 24, 2025, Gomez announced her bid for the Miss Grand Philippines 2025 competition. Following the completion of the 29 candidates vying for the title, she was sashed as the official representative of Zambales during the sashing ceremony held on July 1, 2025, at Okada Manila.

During the Charity Gala and Preliminary Competition held on August 17, 2025, at Okada Manila, Gomez was awarded with 3 sponsor awards. She also emerged as a top 6 finalist for the Best Cultural Costume award.

At the end of the pageant, Gomez finished in the top 15 and was crowned as Miss Asia Pacific Philippines 2025 by Miss Asia Pacific International 2024 Janelis Leyba.

=== Miss Asia Pacific International 2025 ===
As Miss Asia Pacific Philippines 2025, Gomez represented the Philippines at Miss Asia Pacific International 2025. During the press presentation, she was awarded with three sponsor awards and was placed second for the Darling of the Press award. At the national costume competition, she placed as first runner-up for Best National Costume and was awarded with two sponsor awards. During the preliminary competition, she took home the Best in Swimsuit Award.

Following the conclusion of the event, Gomez finished as first runner-up to Isabela Fernandes of Brazil.

== Notes ==
Awards and achievements
Preceded by (Mexico) Karen Sofia Nuñez	Miss Asia Pacific International; 1st Runner-up; 2025	Succeeded by Incumbent
Preceded by Blessa Ericha Figueroa (Northern California)	Miss Asia Pacific International Philippines; 2025	Succeeded by Gabrielle Galapia (Pampanga)
Preceded by Inaugural	Miss Fit Philippines; 2nd Runner-Up; 2020	Succeeded by Mikaela Leonardo (Parañaque)
