= Ganiel Krishnan =

Indian-Filipino beauty queen and journalist

- Born: Ganiel Akrisha Atun Krishnan; September 9, 1994 (age 32); Zamboanga City, Philippines
- Education: Far Eastern University
- Height: 1.68 m (5 ft 6 in)
- Beauty pageant titleholder
- Title: Mutya ng Pilipinas Asia Pacific International 2016
- Agency: Star Magic (2010–present)
- Hair color: Brown
- Eye color: Brown
- Major competitions: Miss Manila 2016 (2nd Runner-Up); Mutya ng Pilipinas 2016 (Winner); Miss Asia Pacific International 2016 (2nd Runner-Up); Miss World Philippines 2021 (2nd Princess) (Resigned)

Ganiel Akrisha Atun Krishnan (Tagalog: [ˈgeɪɲɛl ˈkɾiʃnan]) (born September 9, 1994) is an Indian Filipino beauty queen, journalist, and sportscaster.

She is a courtside reporter for the UAAP broadcast of ABS-CBN Sports+Action, for the varsity teams of her alma mater, FEU Tamaraws. She is also a segment anchor for the segment "Showbiz Spotlight" on TeleRadyo Balita (then TeleRadyo Serbisyo Balita and now Radyo Patrol Balita Alas-Siyete) since September 2020, replacing DJ Chacha who left ABS-CBN for TV5.

== Personal life ==
Ganiel Akrisha Atun Krishnan was born to an Indian-Singaporean father and a Filipino mother. Krishnan began her entertainment career as a finalist of the now-defunct noontime variety show Happy Yipee Yehey!'s segment "My Girl", before being discovered by Johnny Manahan, and later signed with Star Magic. She has also appeared in Maalaala Mo Kaya and Oh My G! in supporting roles, and was part a finalist in Bright Young Manila on Chalk Magazine in 2015.

She was a track and field athlete during her high school studies at Paco Catholic School.

== Pageantry ==
=== Miss Manila 2016 ===
Krishnan was named 2nd Runner-Up of Miss Manila 2016, where she was a crowd favorite.

=== Mutya ng Pilipinas 2016 ===
She was crowned as Mutya ng Pilipinas Asia-Pacific 2016 during its coronation night held at Newport Performing Arts Theater, Resorts World Manila, Pasay on July 30, 2016.

Aside from the title, Krishnan was also awarded the Darling of the Press, Best in Talent, Mutya ng Sheridan Beach Resort, Mutya ng Rain or Shine, Hannah's Best in Swimsuit, Mutya ng Hotel 101, Mutya ng Camera Club of the Philippines and Mutya ng Inglot special awards.

=== Miss Asia Pacific International 2016 ===
She represented the Philippines in the Miss Asia Pacific International 2016 in Puerto Princesa, Palawan where she finished 2nd Runner-Up.

=== Miss World Philippines 2021 ===
In May 2021, she was confirmed as an official candidate for the Miss World Philippines 2021 pageant set for August 8, but later postponed.

On October 4, she was crowned as 2nd princess of the said pageant. A day after, she gave up her title as to focus on her media career. Janelle Lewis of Angeles City, Pampanga subsequently assumed her title as 2nd princess of Miss World Philippines 2021.

== Filmography ==
=== Television ===
Year	Title	Role	Notes	Ref.
2012	Maalaala Mo Kaya: Bahay	Nancy		
2015	Oh My G!	Helga Barrios		
2018–present	TV Patrol	Herself	Reporter/Substitute Anchor	
2020–23	TeleRadyo Balita	Herself	Showbiz Spotlight Anchor	
2023–25	TeleRadyo Serbisyo Balita	Herself	Showbiz Spotlight Anchor	
2024	It's Showtime (Magpasikat 2024)	Herself	"Grim Reaper-ter"	
2025–present	Radyo Patrol Balita Ala-Siyete	Herself	Showbiz Spotlight Anchor	
2026–present	Oh My Gan!	Herself	Host	

=== Film ===
Year	Title	Role
2014	Past Tense	Martina's friend

== See also ==
- Athena Imperial
- Cathy Untalan
- Emma Tiglao
- Tina Marasigan

Awards and achievements
Preceded by Leren Bautista	Mutya ng Pilipinas; Asia Pacific International; 2016	Succeeded by Ilene de Vera
Preceded by Casie Banks	Miss World Philippines; 2nd Princess; 2021 (Resigned)	Succeeded by Janelle Lewis (Assumed)
