= Miss Asia Quest 1968 =

- Date: December 8, 1968
- Entertainment: Pilita Corrales; Maurice Sta. Lucia; The Clubmen; Ateneo Glee Club; Danny Holmsen and Orchestra
- Venue: Araneta Coliseum, Quezon City, Philippines
- Director: Miss Asia Quest Inc.
- Owner: Dr. Vicente Ocampo, Jr.
- Entrants: 12
- Placements: 5
- Debuts: Australia; India; Israel; Japan; Okinawa; Singapore; South Korea; Taiwan; Thailand
- Winner: Macy Shih; Taiwan
- Photogenic: Cassandra Stiles (Australia)

Miss Asia Quest 1968 was the first Miss Quest Asia pageant before it was renamed to its current title, Miss Asia Pacific International. The event was held on December 8, 1968, at the Araneta Coliseum in Quezon City, Philippines.

The pageant aims to promote tourism, peace, goodwill, credit and trading to the participating countries. The winner Macy Shih of Taiwan also received P10,000 (US$ 2,500 at 1968 rates) cash prize, a complete wardrobe, Asian cities tour, gifts ranging from camera to toothpaste. Her court each received P1,000 and prizes in kind.

== Results ==
=== Placements ===
Placement	Contestant
Miss Asia Quest 1968	Taiwan – Macy Shih
1st Runner-Up	Australia – Cassandra Stiles
2nd Runner-Up	Japan – Atsumi Ikeno
3rd Runner-Up	Philippines – Jane Mozo de Goya
4th Runner-Up	Thailand – Valisra Trungvachirachi

==== Special awards ====
Award	Contestant
Miss Friendship	Singapore – Violet Neo
Miss Photogenic	Australia – Cassandra Stiles
Miss Talent	India – Annabella Crawford

== Judges ==
- Guam Senator Earl Conway
- Andrew Gruber
- Alberto de Joya
- Israel Consul Benjamin Abileah
- R. A. Fairweather of the Canadian Embassay
- Kimiko Kuma of the Japanese Embassy
- Bertrand Rault of the French Embassy
- T. E. Colbrook of Australia
- Juan Quintos
- Mrs. Trinidad Enriquez
- Joe Quirino

== Contestants ==
- Australia – Cassandra Stiles
- Ceylon – Marlene Beverly Seneveratne
- Hong Kong – Sandra Cheung
- India – Annabella Crawford
- Israel – Miriam Domkin
- Japan – Atsumi Ikeno
- Okinawa – Sachie Kawamitsu
- Philippines – Jane Mozo de Goya
- Singapore – Violet Neo
- South Korea – Hye-Sun Chang
- Taiwan – Macy Shih
- Thailand – Valisra Trungvachirachi
