= Reina Hispanoamericana 2025 =

33rd Reina Hispanoamericana pageant

- Date: February 9, 2025
- Presenters: Matias Machado; Juliana Barrientos
- Venue: Salón Sirionó, Fexpocruz, Santa Cruz de la Sierra, Bolivia
- Broadcaster: Red Uno, Canal 1 Costa Rica (Simulcast).
- Entrants: 25
- Placements: 12
- Debuts: Guyana; Poland
- Withdrawals: Curaçao; Europe; Indonesia; Italy; Portugal; Trinidad and Tobago
- Returns: Honduras; Panama
- Winner: Dia Maté; Philippines
- Congeniality: Mildred Rincón; Canada
- Best National Costume: Dia Maté; Philippines

Reina Hispanoamericana 2025 was the 33rd Reina Hispanoamericana pageant, held at the Salón Sirionó, Fexpocruz in Santa Cruz de la Sierra, Bolivia, on February 9, 2025.

Maricielo Gamarra of Peru crowned Dia Maté of the Philippines as her successor at the end of the event. This was the Philippines’ second-overall victory in 8 years.

== Results ==
=== Placements ===
Placement	Contestant
Reina Hispanoamericana 2025	Philippines – Dia Maté
Virreina Hispanoamericana 2025	Venezuela – Sofia Férnandez
1st Runner-Up	Colombia – Sharon Gamarra
2nd Runner-Up	Spain – Carolina Barroso
3rd Runner-Up	Peru – Nikita Palma
4th Runner-Up	Brazil – Julia de Castro
5th Runner-Up	Poland – Zuzanna Balonek
Top 12	Bolivia – Estefanía Ibarra; Costa Rica – Catalina Murillo; Ecuador – Dagmar Prieto; Guatemala – Elizabeth Blanco; Mexico – Daniela Cardona

=== Special awards ===
Award	Contestant
Best National Costume	Philippines – Dia Maté
Best Silhouette by Medical Center	Spain - Carolina Barroso
Best Smile by Orest	Puerto Rico – Mayrian Michel
Miss Congeniality	Canada - Mildred Rincón
Miss Ecojet	Venezuela – Sofia Férnandez
Miss Elegance	Venezuela – Sofia Férnandez
Miss Photogenic	Guatemala – Elizabeth Blanco
Miss Tourism	Ecuador – Dagmar Prieto
Nueva Santa Cruz Ambassadress	Colombia – Sharon Gamarra

== Contestants ==
Twenty-five contestants have competed for the title.

Country/Territory	Contestant	Age (Note: Ages at the time of the pageant)	Hometown
Bolivia	Estefanía Ibarra	29	La Paz
Brazil	Julia de Castro	27	Divinópolis
Canada	Mildred Rincón	28	Calgary
Chile	Beatriz Vásquez	28	Las Condes
Colombia	Sharon Gamarra	22	Barranquilla
Costa Rica	Catalina Murillo	27	Heredia
Cuba	Taymi González	24	Havana
Dominican Republic	Mariela Mota	21	Santo Domingo
Ecuador	Dagmar Prieto	25	Quevedo
El Salvador	Gabriela Colindres	29	San Salvador
Guatemala	Elizabeth Blanco	28	Jutiapa
Guyana	Tamara Reusch	21	Santiago
Honduras	Daphne Cristel Gómez	19	Copán
Mexico	Daniela Cardona	24	Mexico City
Nicaragua	Leda Rodríguez	22	Diriomo
Panama	Katherine Fuentes	28	Chiriquí
Paraguay	Carmen Acuña	20	Asunción
Peru	Nikita Palma	24	Huanchaco
Philippines	Dia Maté	23	Kawit
Poland	Zuzanna Balonek	20	Zator
Puerto Rico	Mayrian Michel	21	Ponce
Spain	Carolina Barroso	27	Santa Cruz de Tenerife
United States	Anapaula Morales	24	Miami
Uruguay	Analía Artigas	27	Rivera
Venezuela	Sofia Férnandez	20	La Guaira
