= Miss Asia Pacific International 2026 =

- Date: 10 October 2026
- Presenters: Marc Nelson; Joey Mead King; Gabbi Carballo
- Venue: Mactan Expo, Lapu-Lapu City, Cebu, Philippines
- Entrants: 38
- Placements: 25
- Debuts: Cuba; Norway
- Withdrawals: Canada; Curacao; England; Germany; Hong Kong; Luxembourg; Macau; Morocco; Nepal; Nigeria; Peru; Romania; Taiwan; Turkey; Uganda; United Kingdom; Vietnam; Zambia
- Returns: Bolivia; Costa Rica; El Salvador; Ghana; Myanmar; Pakistan; Portugal; Russia; Sri Lanka; Suriname
- Winner: Sasiwararin Atsawahirankarn; Thailand
- Congeniality: Miku Abe; Japan
- Best National Costume: Sandeepa Sewmini; Sri Lanka
- Photogenic: Gia Angelique Franceschi; Costa Rica

Miss Asia Pacific International 2026 was the seventh edition of Miss Asia Pacific International pageant, held in Mactan Expo, Lapu-Lapu City, Cebu on 10 October 2026. Miss Asia Pacific International 2025, Isabela Fernandes of Brazil, crowned Sasiwararin Atsawahirankarn of Thailand as Miss Asia Pacific International 2026, at the conclusion of the event.

== Results ==
=== Placements ===
Placement	Contestant
Miss Asia Pacific International 2026	Thailand – Sasiwararin Atsawahirankarn
1st Runner-Up	Costa Rica – Gia Franceschi
2nd Runner-Up	South Africa – Nompumelelo Malindi
3rd Runner-Up	Philippines – Gabrielle Galapia §
4th Runner-Up	Mexico – Itzel Borbón ∆
Top 11	Cambodia – Sreyneth Ry ∆; Czech Republic – Valerie Přecechtělová ∆; Dominican Republic – Yunerys Stevens; Indonesia – Elsa Fitriani Putri; Netherlands - Ivana Janssen; Sri Lanka – Sandeepa Sewmini § ‡
Top 15	Bolivia – Jaime Adriana; Brazil – Ana Paula Dos Santos; El Salvador – Alessia Martinez; United States – Sophia Mendiola
Top 25	Colombia – Maria Valentina Alzate; Cuba – Daniella Reyes; France – Océane Tardy; Ghana – Cheryl Abankwa Manu ∆; Guam – Cyndal Abad ∆; Mongolia – Munkhzaya Munkhtsogt; New Zealand – Mikayla Ahkiau; Singapore – Kaia Kwan; South Korea – Yujoo Cho; Suriname – Zoë Loen

§ – Fast Track Events Winners
∆ – Continental Queens of Beauty
‡ – People's Choice Winner

=== Continental Queens ===
Continent	Contestant
Africa	Ghana – Cheryl Abankwa Manu
Americas	Mexico – Itzel Idolina Silva Borbón
Asia	Cambodia – Sreyneth Ry
Europe	Czech Republic – Valerie Přecechtělová
Oceania	Guam – Cyndal Abad

=== Special Awards ===
==== Major Awards ====
Award	Contestant
Best in Swimsuit	Philippines – Gabrielle Galapia
Best in Evening Gown	Philippines – Gabrielle Galapia
Best in National Costume	Sri Lanka – Sandeepa Sewmini Don Samarasinghe Disanayake
Miss Photogenic	Costa Rica – Gia Angelique Franceschi
Miss Congeniality	Japan – Miku Abe
Darling of the Press	Philippines – Gabrielle Galapia
People's Choice	Sri Lanka – Sandeepa Sewmini Don Samarasinghe Disanayake

==== Sponsor Awards ====
Award	Contestant
Miss Missology	United States – Sophia Mendiola
Miss Eventologie	Philippines – Gabrielle Galapia
Miss OMBP Worldwide	Netherlands – Ivana Janssen
Miss Qrown Philippines	Indonesia – Elsa Fitriani Putri Utami
Miss Pageanthology	South Africa – Nompumelelo Malindi
Rising Favourite	Sri Lanka – Sandeepa Sewmini Don Samarasinghe Disanayake
Best in Philippines Expo	South Africa – Nompumelelo Malindi
Miss Sheridan	Mexico – Itzel Idolina Silva Borbón
Miss JPark Island Resort and Waterpark	Philippines – Gabrielle Galapia

=== Best in Swimsuit ===
The Best in Swimsuit Contest was organised at the JPark Island Resort and Waterpark, Lapu-Lapu City, on 6 October 2026.

Placement	Contestant
Winner	Philippines – Gabrielle Galapia
1st Runner-Up	Thailand – Sasiwararin Atsawahirankarn
2nd Runner-Up	Czech Republic – Valerie Přecechtělová

=== Best in National Costume ===
The Best National Costume Contest was organised at the Mactan Shrine, Lapu-Lapu City, on 27 September 2026.

Results	Contestant
Winner	Sri Lanka – Sandeepa Sewmini Don Samarasinghe Disanayake
1st Runner-Up	Philippines – Gabrielle Galapia
2nd Runner-Up	Cambodia – Sreyneth Ry

=== Best in Evening Gown ===
The Best in Evening Gown Contest was organised at the JPark Island Resort and Waterpark, Lapu-Lapu City, on 6 October 2026.

Placement	Contestant
Winner	Philippines – Gabrielle Galapia
1st Runner-Up	Dominican Republic – Yunerys Liriano Stevens
2nd Runner-Up	Thailand – Sasiwararin Atsawahirankarn

=== Darling of the Press ===
Placement	Contestant
Winner	Philippines – Gabrielle Galapia
1st Runner-Up	Honduras – Denise Martinez
2nd Runner-Up	Thailand – Sasiwararin Atsawahirankarn

=== Rising Favourite ===
Placement	Contestant
Winner	Sri Lanka – Sandeepa Sewmini Don Samarasinghe Disanayake
1st Runner-Up	Singapore – Kaia Kwan
2nd Runner-Up	Norway – Frida Sørlie Gjevre

== Contestants ==
Thirty-eight contestants competed for the title.

Country/Territory	Contestant	Age	Hometown
Australia	Sarah Giannou	–	Sydney
Belgium	Sarah Rottiers	–	Rotselaar
Bolivia	Jaime Ardaya Adriana	20	Reyes
Brazil	Ana Paula Dos Santos Pessoa	–	Tocantins
Cambodia	Sreyneth Ry	26	Preah Sihanouk
China	Yunhan Wang	–	–
Colombia	Maria Valentina Alzate	25	Magdalena
Costa Rica	Gia Angelique Franceschi	24	Alajuela
Cuba	Daniella Michelle Reyes	28	Havana
Czech Republic	Valerie Přecechtělová	25	Klenovice na Hané
Dominican Republic	Yunerys Liriano Stevens	26	Santo Domingo
El Salvador	Alessia Malena Martinez Cano	–	San Salvador
France	Océane Tardy	25	Royan
Ghana	Cheryl Abankwa Manu	–	The Hague
Guam	Cyndal Abad	26	Hagåtña
Honduras	Denise Martinez	26	Tegucigalpa
India	Yodenla Bhutia	–	Sikkim
Indonesia	Elsa Fitriani Putri Utami	25	Samarinda
Japan	Miku Abe	–	Meguro
Malaysia	Nur Athiya Hazira Mohd Jamil Puad	26	Kedah
Mexico	Itzel Idolina Silva Borbón	–	Tijuana
Mongolia	Munkhzaya Munkhtsogt	19	Khentii
Myanmar	Poe Eaindray Khit	31	Yangon
Netherlands	Ivana Janssen	18	Kerkrade
New Zealand	Mikayla Ahkiau	–	Auckland
Norway	Frida Sørlie Gjevre	20	Asker
Pakistan	Laiba Khan	29	Karachi
Philippines	Gabrielle Galapia	22	Magalang
Portugal	Leandra Oliveira Ferreira	25	Barcelos
Russia	Lilia Milina	–	–
Singapore	Kaia Kwan	20	Singapore
South Africa	Nompumelelo Melindi	24	Johannesburg
South Korea	Yujoo Cho	22	Seoul
Spain	Jolie Nicole Baquirin	–	Barcelona
Sri Lanka	Sandeepa Sewmini Don Samarasinghe Disanayake	26	Galle
Suriname	Zoë Loen	24	Apetina
Thailand	Sasiwararin Atsawahirankarn	26	Chiang Mai
United States	Sophia Mendiola	18	San Diego
