= Miss Asia Pacific International 2005 =

- Date: 9 April 2005
- Venue: Guangzhou, China
- Entrants: 51
- Placements: 5
- Winner: Leonora Jiménez (Costa Rica) (Resigned); Yevgeniya Lapova (Assumed); Russia

Miss Asia Pacific International 2005, formerly titled Miss Asia Pacific Quest in 2003, the 36th Miss Asia Pacific International pageant, was held on 9 April 2005 at Guangzhou, China where 51 candidates competed for the title. Tatyana Nikita of Russia crowned her successor Leonora Jiménez of Costa Rica at the end of the contest.

Not long after winning the crown, Jiménez was resigned in order to compete at another rival pageant which is Miss World. The first runner-up Yevgeniya Lapova of Russia replaced her as the winner. The runners-up moved up one position which then makes Jedah Hernandez of the Philippines became third runner-up.

== Results ==
=== Placements ===
Placement	Contestant
Miss Asia Pacific International 2005	Costa Rica – Leonora Jiménez (Resigned)
1st Runner-Up	Russia – Yevgeniya Lapova (Assumed)
2nd Runner-up	China – Zhang Li Ru
3rd Runner-Up	Peru – Claudia de Zevallos
4th Runner-Up	Philippines – Jedah Hernandez

== Contestants ==
Fifty-one contestants competed for the title.

Country/Territory	Contestant	Age	Hometown
Afghanistan	Vida Samadzai	25	Kabul
Albania	Vilma Masha	21	Tirana
Argentina	Laura Romero	23	La Plata
Australia	Laura Frances Weston	22	
Bahamas	Leslia Miller	26	Nassau
Bolivia	Gloria Mariana Limpias	18	Santa Cruz de la Sierra
Brazil	Natalia Souza Araujo	20	
Bulgaria	Katya Petrova	20	Sofia
Canada	April Mullings	24	
Chile	Adriana Barrientos	24	
China	Zhang Liru	25	Beijing
Colombia	Vivian Vanessa Gomez	22	
Costa Rica	Leonora Jiménez	22	Santa Ana
Denmark	Masja Juel	25	Copenhagen
El Salvador	Nessie Anaya	19	La Libertad
England	Allison Brennan		
Ethiopia	Amleset Muchie		
French Polynesia	Anne Maite Morou		
Greece	Anna Dantchenko Karagiannopoulou		
Haiti	Channa Cius		
Honduras	Lesly Gabriela Molina Kristoffp		
Hungary	Diana Maloveczky		
India	Simran Chandhok		
Iran	Jaleh Benshian		
Lebanon	Rita Lahoud		
Malaysia	Hui-Yin Wong		
Nepal	Sarah Gurung		
New Caledonia	Aurore Tissot		
New Zealand	Kylie Anderson		
Nigeria	Awa Dicko		
Panama	Giselle Marie Bissot Kieswetter		
Paraguay	Paloma Maria Navarro Weyer		
Peru	Claudia Ortiz de Zevallos		
Philippines	Jedah Hernandez		
Poland	Urszula Rozniecka		
Russia	Eugeniya Lapova		
Scotland	Megan Elizabeth Johnson		
Singapore	Colleen Francisca Pereira		
Slovakia	Olivia Laniova		
South Africa	Jenilee Peters		
South Korea	Young-Ah Choi		
Sri Lanka	Kapuruge Tehani Renata Perera		
Sweden	Florina Weisz		
Taiwan	Weng Huichun	26	
Thailand	Suthida Deesri		
Turkey	Buket Koroglu		
Uruguay	María Jimena Rivas Fernández		
United States	Raquel Beezly		
Venezuela	Marilyn Ferreira Pascual		
Vietnam	Mai Trang Ngo Thi		
Wales	Laura Jane Livesey		
