= Face of Beauty International 2024 =

10th edition of Face of Beauty International

- Date: September 19, 2024
- Venue: Lin Palace, Kaohsiung, Taiwan
- Entrants: 35
- Placements: 5
- Winner: Jeanne Isabelle Bilasano; Philippines
- Best National Costume: Jeanne Isabelle Bilasano; Philippines
- Photogenic: Anita Wang; Taiwan
- Friendship: Elvia Marie Torres Sanchez; Puerto Rico

Face of Beauty International 2024 was an edition of the Face of Beauty International pageant held on September 19, 2024, at the Lin Palace in Kaohsiung, Taiwan.

At the end of the event, Kendra Kaing Zar Thant from Myanmar Face of Beauty International 2023 crowned Jeanne Isabelle Bilasano of the Philippines. She became the first Filipina to win the international title.

== Background ==
The 2024 edition of Face of Beauty International was held in Kaohsiung, Taiwan, on September 19, 2024. The competition brought together contestants representing different countries and territories for the international pageant. The event featured competitions in both the main and teen categories. Contestants participated in activities and preliminary events leading up to the final competition, where the winners and runners-up were announced.

The Philippines was represented by Jeanne Isabelle Bilasano, who went on to win the main competition, marking the country's first victory in the pageant.

== Results ==
Participating nations that won from 2013 to 2025.

=== Placements ===
Placement	Contestant	Country/territory	Ref.
Face of Beauty International 2024	Jeanne Isabelle Bilasano	Philippines	
1st runner-up	Anita Wang	Taiwan	
2nd runner-up	Stephanie Fernandez	Colombia	
3rd runner-up	Sabne Lata Mailei	Tonga	
4th runner-up	Warunchana Radomlek	Thailand	

=== Teen category ===
Participating countries and territories that won from 2013 to 2025 teen category.

The 2024 competition also featured the Teen Face of Beauty International category. According to the official pageant results, Elvia Marie Torres Sanchez of Puerto Rico won the title.

Placement	Contestant	Country/territory
Teen Face of Beauty International 2024	Elvia Marie Torres Sanchez	Puerto Rico
First runner-up	Emily Tan	Malaysia
Second runner-up	Precious Anne Condeza Oño	Mexico
Third runner-up	Cynthia Mendes	Portugal
Fourth runner-up	Shreena Simon	Singapore
Top 15
Vanessa Báez Segarra		Ecuador
Sunishma Singh		Fiji
Aria Pauline Gálvez		Hawaii
Claudya Florenzy		Indonesia
Alin Cohen		USA

=== Special awards ===
The following special awards were announced by the pageant organization.

Award	Recipient	Country/territory
I AM ME Award	Zaley Tamihana Brown	New Zealand
Face of Beauty World	Percilla Alovili	Niue
Face of Beauty Universe	Alin Cohen	United States
Face of Beauty Earth	Iida Hynnilä	Finland
Face of Beauty Globe	Kimberley Karstunen	Canada
Miss Friendship	Elvia Marie Torres Sanchez	Puerto Rico
Best in Talent	Nanami Kabuki	Japan
Best in Interview	Natasha Nash	Australia

== Contestants ==
The following are the list of contestants who participated in the 2024 edition.

Contestants of Face of Beauty International 2024
Country/territory	Contestant
Australia	Natasha Lee Russell Nash
Belgium	Kayleigh Van Molle
Belarus	Volha Leanovich
Botswana	Seneo Audrey Perry
Brazil	Maria Clara Romeiro Santos Oliveira Lima
Canada	Kimberley Karstunen
Colombia	Stephanie Fernández Peñaranda
Cambodia	Lao Pich Piseth
South Korea	Serim Cho
Ecuador	Kelly Vanessa Báez Segarra
Egypt	Amal El Sheimy
United States	Alin Dina Cohen
Philippines	Jeanne Isabelle Bilasano
Finland	Iida Maria Hynnilä
Fiji	Sunishma Singh
France	Clémence Lerouge
Hawaii	Maria Aria Pauline Galvez
Indonesia	Claudya Froenzy Indra
Iran	Melika Tohidi
Japan	Nanami Kabuki
Luxembourg	Davina Vercruysse
Malaysia	Emily Tan
Mexico	Precious Anne Condeza Oño
Myanmar	Yin May Hnin
Niue	Percilla Jane Alovili
New Zealand	Zaley Omega Tamihana-Brown
Pakistan	Rabali Aslam Rai
Netherlands	Sarah van Alem
Portugal	Cynthia Mendes
Puerto Rico	Elvia Marie Torres Sánchez
Russia	Karina Gubina
Singapore	Shreena Simon
Switzerland	Meily Wickart
Thailand	Warunchana Radomlek
Taiwan	Anita Wang
Tonga	Sabne Lata Mailei
