= Dia Maté =

Filipino singer and beauty pageant titleholder (born 2001)

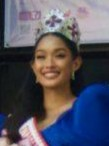
- Maté in 2025
- Born: Deanna Marie Remulla Maté; September 18, 2001 (age 25); Kawit, Cavite, Philippines
- Occupations: Singer; songwriter; record producer
- Relatives: Remulla family
- Beauty pageant titleholder
- Title: Reina Hispanoamericana Filipinas 2024; Reina Hispanoamericana 2025
- Major competitions: Miss Universe Philippines 2024; (Unplaced); Miss World Philippines 2024; (Top 10); Reina Hispanoamericana 2025; (Winner; Best National Costume)
- Musical career
- Genre: Alt-pop
- Instruments: Vocals
- Years active: 2021–present
- Label: Island Records

Deanna Marie "Dia" Remulla Maté (born September 18, 2001) is a Filipino singer, songwriter, record producer, and beauty pageant titleholder who won Reina Hispanoamericana 2025.

Maté debuted as an alt-pop artist in 2021 under Island Records with the single Heart Hates Me, which was followed by the extended play Don't Quote Me. In 2024, she transition into a brigher pop sound with the single Ganda Gandahan.

Maté competed in Miss Universe Philippines 2024 and Miss World Philippines 2024. At Miss World Philippines 2024, she won the Reina Hispanoamericana 2025 title.

== Early life and education ==
Deanna Marie Remulla Maté was born in Cavite, Philippines, on September 18, 2001. Her parents, Lea Remulla and Mike Maté, are business and marketing professionals. Her maternal grandfather is longtime politician Jesus Crispin Remulla.

For her secondary education, Maté entered the International Baccalaureate Diploma Programme, where she chose music as one of her subjects. She interned at MCA Records and went on a gap year before studying communications technology at the Ateneo de Manila University.

== Pageantry ==
In May 2024, Maté entered her first pageant, Miss Universe Philippines 2024, and did not reach the top 20. Later in July, she competed in Miss World Philippines 2024, and received the title of Reina Hispanoamericana Filipinas 2024. On February 10, Maté won Miss Reina Hispanoamericana, making her the second Filipino contestant to ever win the pageant, after Winwyn Marquez in 2017.

== Career ==
In early 2021, Island Records launched Maté as an alt-pop artist, with her first single, Heart Hates Me, in March. In a press release, she said "I write and produce my own material. Sometimes I start off by making a beat. When I complete it, I try to create a melody over that. Once I have the melody down, I'll write the lyrics and then record them. Once everything is recorded, I'll add backing vocals, harmonies, and sometimes I'll sample my vocals and use weird effects." Later that year, she released the single One of the Boys and a four-track extended play titled don't quote me.

In January 2022, Maté released the single Fantasy, produced by her frequent collaborator Fern. On August 26, she a released a second single, called Kalimutan (transl. To Forget), with lyrics in a mix of Filipino and English. She wrote the song after Quest challenged her to write a happy song. "It is about accepting who you are, moving on from the past and finally moving forward with positive emotion. The journey to acceptance can be a difficult experience. But when you are finally there, life becomes a little bit brighter," she said of it.

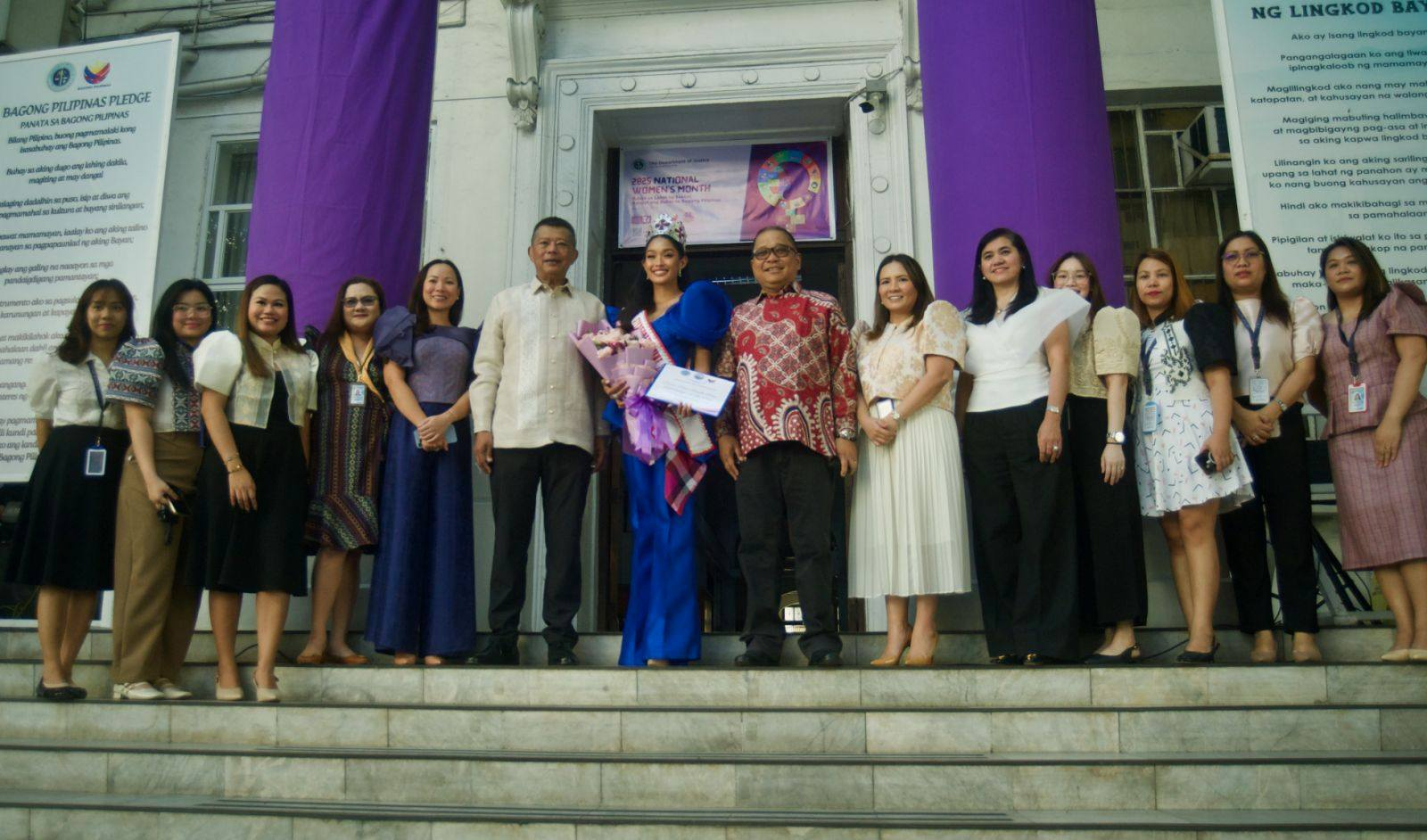
Maté with her grandfather, Justice Secretary Jesus Crispin Remulla (seventh and sixth from the left, respectively), and other Department of Justice officials in 2025

In December, she released a single called Ganda Gandahan: (transl. Acting Pretty), describing it as an empowering song that "outrageously champions beauty" and dedicated it to women and the LGBTQ+ community. She co-wrote it with openly queer Cebuano artist Dom Guyot. Mega magazine introduced Maté as an empowered morena pop star.

On January 19, 2025, Maté released a doo-wop-influenced love song, Ikaw Ang Pinili Ko (transl. You're The One I Chose). The music video for the single starring herself and Labajo was released on February 14, 2025.

On September 25, 2025, Maté participated in the fourth season of the impersonation competition show, Your Face Sounds Familiar, as one of the eight celebrity contestants. She finished the competition in seventh place.

Awards and achievements
| Preceded by Maricielo Gamarra | Reina Hispanoamericana; 2025 | Succeeded by Kimberly de Boer |
| Preceded by Michelle Arceo (Quezon City) | Reina Hispanoamericana Filipinas; 2024 | Succeeded by Beatriz Mclelland (Aklan) |
