= Face of Beauty International =

International beauty pageant

- FOBI
- Formation: March 2, 2012
- Type: Beauty pageant
- Headquarters: Auckland
- Location: New Zealand
- Official language: English
- Founder: Mila Manuel
- Current titleholder: Pitchayawi Yokoyama; Thailand
- Most recent edition: 2026
- Parent organization: Face of Beauty International Ltd.
- Website: www.faceofbeautyinternational.com

Face of Beauty International is an annual international beauty pageant that features contestants from various countries and territories. It was started in 2011 and established on 2012, in Auckland, New Zealand, under the leadership of Mila Manuel.

The pageant has gained popularity in international competitions and has been hosted in various countries, including Thailand, Taiwan, Mongolia, India, and, most recently, the Philippines.

The reigning Face of Beauty International is Pitchayawi Yokoyama from Thailand who was crowned on October 30, 2026, in Taipei, Taiwan, securing Thailand's third victory in the competition.

== History ==
The pageant began in 2011, but it was not until 2012 that its CEO and founder, Mila Manuel, officially registered the company, Face of Beauty International Ltd., in Auckland, New Zealand. The first international event was held in 2012, titled Miss Teen Face of Beauty International, and featured over 14 contestants from various countries and territories. It took place at the Valentine Garden Resort in Chiang Mai, Thailand. In 2013, the pageant adopted its current name, Face of Beauty International. Face of Beauty International is a global beauty pageant that emphasizes international tourism, public entertainment, and the promotion of a clean and safe environment for all living beings.

The age range for contestants is 15 to 24 years old, with no restrictions on height or weight. The event promotes an end to violence against women and the protection of vulnerable individuals. It aims to develop young leaders. Contestants participate in charity events, workshops, symposiums, and competitions in categories such as swimwear, national costume, and evening gown. They also take part in activities throughout the host country. In 2015, the Teen Face of Beauty International title was introduced as an additional award given on the same night as the main event.

== Titleholders ==
Edition	Year	Face of Beauty International	Teen Face of Beauty International	Venue	Entrants	Ref.
1st	2012	Not awarded	Josefine Emilie Egebjerg; Denmark	Chiang Mai, Thailand	14	
2nd	2013	Diamond Langi; Tonga	Not awarded	Na Chom Thian, Thailand	37	
3rd	2014	Gimena Ghilarducci; Argentina	Not awarded	Taichung, Taiwan	38	
4th	2015	Gisela Yeraldi Barraza; Mexico	Neilymarie Soto Lozada; Puerto Rico	Kaohsiung, Taiwan	42	
5th	2016	Alena Raeva; Russia	Chuu Thaint Myat Noe; Myanmar	Ulan Bator, Mongolia	47	
6th	2017	Tanisa Panyapoo; Thailand	Elizabeth "Lizzy" Moolman; South Africa	New Delhi, India	40	
7th	2018	Myint Mo May; Myanmar	Amandine Bonehill; Benelux	New Delhi, India	42	
8th	2019	Peerachada Khunrak; Thailand	Leia Edmonds; New Zealand	Mabalacat, Philippines	37	
2020–2022 Cancelled due to the COVID-19 pandemic.
9th	2023	Caroline Dias Tozaki (Resigned); Brazil	Kendra Kaing Zar Thant; Myanmar	Camaligan, Philippines	27	
9th	2023	Kendra Kaing Zar Thant (Assumed); Myanmar	Kendra Kaing Zar Thant; Myanmar	Camaligan, Philippines	27	
10th	2024	Jeanne Isabelle Bilasano; Philippines	Elvia Marie Torres Sanchez; Puerto Rico	Kaohsiung, Taiwan	34	
11th	2025	Nikki Buenafe Cheveh; Philippines	Léa Voyame; Italy	Taichung, Taiwan	32	
12th	2026	Pitchayawi Yokoyama; Thailand	Karina Uuemaa; Estonia	Taipei, Taiwan	32	

=== Countries/territories by number of wins ===
Face of Beauty International

Country/Territory	Titles	Year(s)
Thailand	3	2017, 2019, 2026
Philippines	2	2024, 2025
Myanmar	2	2018, 2023 (Note: Kendra Kaing Zar Thant from Myanmar (Assumed) the title after the winner unable to fulfill her duties.)
Brazil	1	2023 ~~(Note: Caroline Dias Tozaki of Brazil who won the Face of Beauty International 2023 (Resigned) from the title.)~~
Russia	1	2016
Mexico	1	2015
Argentina	1	2014
Tonga	1	2013

Teen Face of Beauty International

Country/Territory	Titles	Year(s)
Puerto Rico	2	2015, 2024
Myanmar	2	2016, 2023
Estonia	1	2026
Italy	1	2025
New Zealand	1	2019
Benelux	1	2018
South Africa	1	2017
Denmark	1	2012

== Gallery of winner ==
Face of Beauty International 2025
Nikki Buenafe Cheveh

== Crossovers ==
- Kendra Kaing Zar Thant from Myanmar fulfilled both Face Of Beauty International 2023 & Teen Face Of Beauty International 2023 duties at once. After a year , she participated in Miss International 2024 and remained unplaced.
- Josefine Emilie Egebjerg from Denmark crowned Face of Beauty International 2012, she withdraw from Miss International 2013 competition representing Denmark.
- Diamond Langi from Tonga who was crowned Face of Beauty International 2013, after a year she participated in Miss Earth 2017 and finished top 16 semi-finalists.
- Alena Raeva of Russia crowned Face of Beauty International 2016, she was then participated in Miss Eco Universe 2016 and ended top 16 semi-finalists.

== See also ==
- List of beauty pageants
