= Miss Asia Pacific International 2016 =

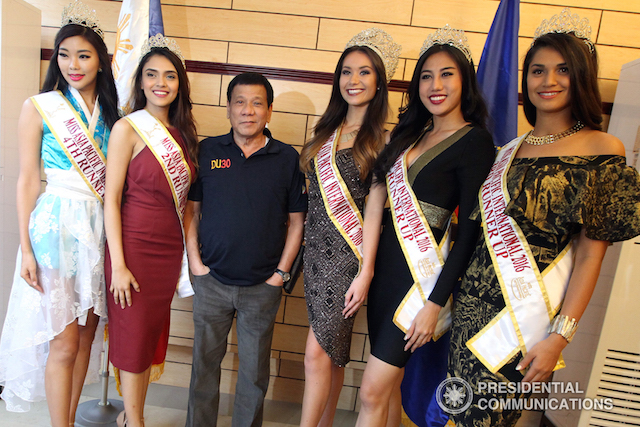
- Rodrigo Duterte poses with the winners of Miss Asia Pacific International 2016
- Date: 23 November 2016
- Presenters: Mark Nelson; Michelle Aldana
- Venue: Sheridan Beach Resort & Spa Puerto Princesa, Palawan, Philippines
- Entrants: 40
- Placements: 15
- Withdrawals: Ghana; Mandalay; Paraguay
- Winner: Tessa le Conge; Netherlands
- Photogenic: Felicia George (Cook Islands)

Miss Asia Pacific International 2016 was an international beauty contest edition of Miss Asia Pacific International held in Puerto Princesa, Palawan, Philippines on November 23, 2016. Forty women from all over the world vied for the crown and for the title of Miss Asia Pacific International.

Tessa le Conge of the Netherlands won the pageant and was crowned Miss Asia Pacific International 2016.

== History ==
The oldest beauty pageant of its kind in Asia, MAPI commenced in the Philippines in 1968.

After 10 year-hiatus and managerial changes, Miss Asia Pacific International was re-launched and revived in 2016 under new ownership and management headed by MAPI President, Jacqueline Tan-Sainz.

== Results ==
=== Placements ===
Placement	Contestant
Miss Asia Pacific International 2016	Netherlands – Tessa le Conge
1st Runner-Up	Thailand – Chawanya Thanomwong
2nd Runner-Up	Philippines – Ganiel Krishnan
3rd Runner-Up	Cook Islands – Felicia George
4th Runner-Up	South Korea – So-yeon Kim
Top 10	Colombia – Stephanie Fernández; India – Shiva Srishti Vyakaranam; New Caledonia – Mondy Laigle; New Zealand – Amalina Bunyasakdi; Russia – Tatiana Tsimfer
Top 15	Australia – Madeleine Stock; Canada – Natalie Carriere; Guam – Audre dela Cruz; Peru – Ana Lucía Leiva §; Siberia – Maria Platonova

§ – People's Choice winner

=== Special Awards II ===
Awards	1st Place	2nd Place	3rd Place
Darling of the Press	Nay Chi Lin; Yangon	Natalie Carriere; Canada	Achol Arow; South Sudan
Best in National Costume	An Nisaa Meidina; Indonesia	Chawanya Thanomwong; Thailand	Ganiel Krishnan; Philippines
Best in Swimsuit	Chawanya Thanomwong; Thailand	Jose Stephanie Fernandez; Colombia	So-yeon Kim; South Korea
Best in Evening Gown	Stephanie Fernández; Colombia	So-yeon Kim; South Korea	Ganiel Krishnan; Philippines
Best in Talent	Felicia George; Cook Islands	Ganiel Krishnan; Philippines	Ana Lucía Leiva; Peru

== Contestants ==
Forty contestants competed for the 2016 MAPI title.

Country/Territory	Delegate	Age
Australia	Madeleine Stock	19
Bangladesh	Lamiya Hoque	19
Belarus	Polli Cannabis	23
Bolivia	Catherine Caceres	25
Canada	Natalie Carriere	23
China	Le Zhao	21
Colombia	Stephanie Fernández	24
Cook Islands	Felicia George	20
Egypt	Aysel Khaled	20
France	Pauline Leullieux	24
Germany	Mona Schafnitzl	21
Guam	Audre de la Cruz	21
Hong Kong	Qi Kong	19
India	Shiva Srishti Vyakaranam	24
Indonesia	An Nisaa Meidana	19
Iraq	Farah Al Haddad	19
Japan	Natsuki Suzuki	24
Lebanon	Mony Zreik	21
Macau	Xunyuan Zhang	25
Malaysia	Rishon Shun	22
Mongolia	Uyanga Amarmend	26
Myanmar	Nan Hlaing Hlaing Moe	25
Nepal	Anshu Khatri Chhetri	24
Netherlands	Tessa Le Conge	22
New Caledonia	Mondy Laigle	22
New Zealand	Amalina Bunyasakdi	23
Pakistan	Madeeha Naseer	24
Peru	Ana Lucía Leiva	23
Philippines	Ganiel Krishnan	22
Russia	Tatiana Tsimfer	25
Siberia	Maria Platanova	25
Singapore	Ariel Xu	23
South Korea	So-yeon Kim	25
South Sudan	Achol Arow	22
Taiwan	Mei-Hsuan Lai	26
Thailand	Chawanya Thanomwong	22
Ukraine	Sofia Kukonesku	23
United States	Kristian Navarre	26
Vietnam	Thu Thảo Hoàng	22
Yangon	Nay Chi Lin	24

== See also ==
- List of beauty contests
- Miss Asia Pacific International
