= Emma Tiglao =

Filipino actress, model and beauty queen (born 1994)

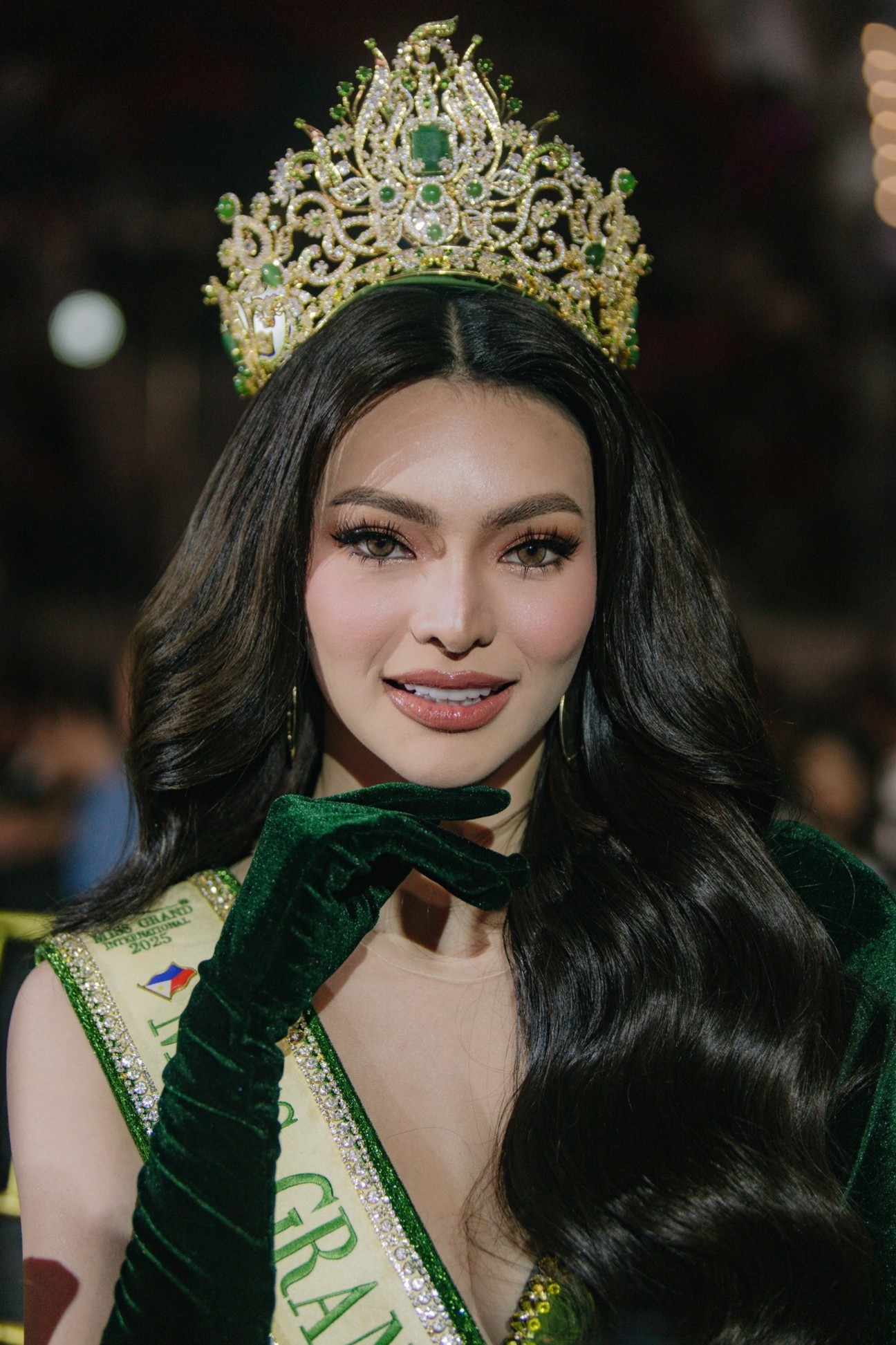
- Tiglao in 2026
- Born: Emma Mary Francisco Tiglao; December 8, 1994 (age 31); Mabalacat, Pampanga, Philippines
- Education: Holy Angel University (BS)
- Occupations: Model; actress; journalist; news anchor; television presenter
- Beauty pageant titleholder
- Title: Binibining Pilipinas Intercontinental 2019; Miss Grand Philippines 2025; Miss Grand International 2025
- Major competitions: Mutya ng Pilipinas 2012; (1st Runner-Up); Binibining Pilipinas 2014 (Top 15); Miss World Philippines 2015; (4th Princess); Miss Midori Clark 2018; (1st Runner-up); Binibining Pilipinas 2019; (Winner – Binibining Pilipinas Intercontinental); Miss Intercontinental 2019; (Top 20); Miss Grand Philippines 2025; (Winner); Miss Grand International 2025; (Winner); (Country's Power of the Year)

Emma Mary Francisco Tiglao (Tagalog: [ˈɛmːɐ ˈtɪɡlɐw]; born December 8, 1994) is a Filipino actress, model, journalist, news anchor, television presenter, and beauty pageant titleholder who was crowned Miss Grand International 2025. She is the second Filipina Miss Grand International in the history of the competition, following CJ Opiaza the year prior.

Tiglao was previously crowned Miss Grand Philippines 2025. In 2019, she was also crowned Binibining Pilipinas Intercontinental 2019, and represented the Philippines at the Miss Intercontinental 2019 pageant in Egypt, where she finished in the top 20.

== Early life and education ==
Emma Mary Francisco Tiglao was born on December 8, 1994, as the youngest of four children of Antonio and Isabelita Tiglao in Mabalacat, Pampanga, Philippines. Tiglao attended Holy Angel University in Angeles City, and graduated in the dean's list with a degree in International Tourism Management in 2014. She then worked as a model-ambassador for a hotel in Cambodia.

== Career ==
=== Modeling and television work ===
Tiglao mainly worked as a model in Cambodia, Malaysia, Singapore, China, South Korea, and Japan before becoming a news anchor for Eagle Broadcasting Corporation's primetime news program Mata ng Agila. Since 2021, she has been one of the main hosts of NET25's talk show program Kada Umaga.

=== Pageantry ===
Tiglao began competing in beauty pageants at the age of 13, with her first foray being a competition at her school.

==== Mutya ng Pilipinas 2012 ====
Tiglao competed in Mutya ng Pilipinas 2012 and placed 1st-runner up to Rizzini Alexis Gomez.

==== Binibining Pilipinas 2014 ====
Tiglao competed in Binibining Pilipinas 2014 and reached the top 15. Mary Jean Lastimosa won as Miss Universe Philippines.

==== Miss World Philippines 2015 ====
In 2015, Tiglao entered Miss World Philippines 2015 and was proclaimed the fourth princess.

==== Miss Midori Clark 2018 ====
In 2018, Tiglao entered Miss Midori Clark 2018 and was proclaimed 1st-runner up.

==== Binibining Pilipinas 2019 ====
Tiglao competed in and won Binibining Pilipinas 2019 on June 9, 2019, at the Smart Araneta Coliseum. She won two special awards during the ceremony; Best in National Costume and Miss Pizza Hut. She was crowned by the previous winner, Karen Gallman, Miss Intercontinental 2018.

==== Miss Intercontinental 2019 ====
Tiglao represented the Philippines at Miss Intercontinental 2019 on December 20, 2019, in Egypt and finished in the top 20. She also won the Miss Popularity and Miss May Care awards.

In 2022, Tiglao confirmed that she was leaving beauty pageantry.

==== Miss Grand Philippines 2025 ====
In 2025, Tiglao announced her return to pageantry after six years. On July 1, 2025, she became an official candidate of the Miss Grand Philippines 2025 representing Pampanga.

At the coronation night, she wore a gown by Filipino designer Rian Fernandez. At the end of the event, she was crowned Miss Grand Philippines 2025.

==== Miss Grand International 2025 ====
Tiglao represented the Philippines at the Miss Grand International 2025 pageant in Thailand on October 18, 2025. She was fast-tracked into the top 20 by winning the "Country's Power of the Year". On the finals night, Emma wore a custom gown by Filipino designer Rian Fernandez. The gown was rendered in a burnt‑orange / molten‑gold hue, intended to evoke a phoenix rising from the ashes — symbolic of “rebirth” and triumph.

Tiglao went on to win the competition, and was crowned by compatriot and outgoing queen CJ Opiaza, heralding the first-ever back-to-back win for the Philippines and in the history of the Miss Grand International competition. Tiglao also won the "Global Beauties' Expert Choice Award" by the said beauty pageant portal and community. She eventually crowned Jihan Dimack of Tanzania as her successor, on Miss Grand International 2026 in Thailand.

== Filmography ==
=== Television ===
Year	Title	Role
2019	Rated K	Guest
2019	Magandang Buhay	Guest
2019	The Bottomline with Boy Abunda	Guest
2020–2023	Mata ng Agila	News anchor
2021–2025	Kada Umaga	Host
2023	Mata ng Agila sa Tanghali	News anchor

=== Movies ===
Year	Title	Role
2015	No Boyfriend Since Birth	Bride 4

=== TV commercials ===
Year	Title
2021	Chowking Siomai Chao Fan Family Platter

=== Music videos ===
Title	Year	Director(s)	Ref.
"Paruparo" (with Bini)	2026	Kerbs Balagtas	

Awards and achievements
Preceded by CJ Opiaza (Assumed)	Miss Grand International; 2025	Succeeded by Jihan Dimack
Preceded by Malin Chara-anan	Country's Power of The Year; 2025	Succeeded by Shyare Andrade
Preceded by CJ Opiaza (Castillejos)	Miss Grand Philippines; 2025	Succeeded by Angelica Lopez (Palawan)
Preceded by Karen Gallman (Bohol)	Binibining Pilipinas Intercontinental; 2019	Succeeded by Cindy Obeñita (Cagayan de Oro)
