= Miss Asia Pacific International 2025 =

- Date: 8 October 2025
- Presenters: Marc Nelson
- Venue: Cebu Coliseum, Cebu City, Philippines
- Entrants: 43
- Placements: 30
- Debuts: Curaçao; Uganda
- Withdrawals: Bangladesh; Bolivia; Chile; Russia; Sweden; Tonga; Venezuela
- Returns: Brazil; Cambodia; China; Dominican Republic; England; Honduras; Luxembourg; Macau; Mongolia; Morocco; Nepal; Romania; South Africa; Spain; Turkey
- Winner: Isabela Fernandes; Brazil
- Congeniality: Lisa Malasch-Erkens; Germany
- Best National Costume: Bawonrat Maneerat; Thailand
- Photogenic: Danube Kangjam; India

Miss Asia Pacific International 2025 was the sixth edition of Miss Asia Pacific International pageant, held in Cebu Coliseum, Cebu City on 8 October 2025.

Due to the trauma caused by the 6.9 earthquake originating from Bogo, Cebu, Janelis Leyba of the United States was unable to crown her successor and had to leave the country for the US immediately. Miss Asia Pacific International 2018, Sharifa Akeel, crowned Isabela Fernandes of Brazil, as Miss Asia Pacific International 2025, at the conclusion of the event.

== Results ==
=== Placements ===
Placement	Contestant
Miss Asia Pacific International 2025	Brazil – Isabela Fernandes §
1st Runner-Up	Philippines – Anita Rose Gomez §
2nd Runner-Up	Thailand – Bawonrat Maneerat §
3rd Runner-Up	Belgium – Jana Janssens
4th Runner-Up	Netherlands – Elmira Wildboer ∆
Top 10	Mexico – Mariana García; Mongolia – Baasansuren Budsuren; Nepal – Prapti Ranabhat; New Zealand – Hannah Cross ∆; Peru – Michella Lazarte ∆
Top 30	Cambodia – Mealyann Saing; Canada – Naomi Shotlander; Colombia – Patricia Diaz; Dominican Republic – Charlyn Corona; England – Monica De Freitas; Germany – Lisa Malasch-Erkens; Honduras – Violeta Soto; Hong Kong – Chi Kwan Lau; India – Danube Kangjam; Indonesia – Aisyah Amini ∆; Macau – Alicia Mui; Malaysia – Sheena Shan; Nigeria – Tracy Johnson; Romania – Elena Gogelescu; Singapore – Krisha Raj; South Africa – Bejandri Lourens ∆; Taiwan – Hsin Hui Chen; United Kingdom – Anna Gomes ‡; United States – Kayla Usison; Vietnam – Dương Ngọc Ánh

§ – Fast Track Events Winners
∆ – Continental Queens of Beauty
‡ – People's Choice Winner

=== Continental Queens ===
Continent	Contestant
Africa	South Africa – Bejandri Lourens
Americas	Peru – Michella Lazarte
Asia	Indonesia – Aisyah Amini
Europe	Netherlands – Elmira Wildboer
Oceania	New Zealand – Hannah Cross

=== Special Awards ===
==== Major Awards ====
Award	Contestant
Best in Swimsuit	Philippines – Anita Rose Gomez
Best in Evening Gown	Brazil – Isabela Fernandes
Best in National Costume	Thailand – Bawonrat Maneerat
Miss Photogenic	India – Danube Kangjam
Miss Multimedia	India – Danube Kangjam
Miss Congeniality	Germany – Lisa Malasch-Erkens
Darling of the Press	United States – Kayla Jane Usison
People's Choice	United Kingdom – Anna Gomes

==== Sponsor Awards ====
Award	Contestant
Miss Cindyrella Drip	Cambodia – Mealyann Saing; Philippines – Anita Rose Gomez; Thailand – Bawonrat Maneerat
Miss Jpark Island Resort Cebu	Germany – Lisa Malasch-Erkens
Miss Nustar	Brazil – Isabela Fernandes
Miss Zanea	Brazil – Isabela Fernandes
Miss Sheridan	New Zealand – Hannah Cross
Miss Stronghold	India – Danube Kangjam
Miss Train Station	Thailand – Bawonrat Maneerat
Miss Brainstrong	Philippines – Anita Rose Gomez
Miss Hotel 101	Philippines – Anita Rose Gomez
Miss RMBZ Nutramin's Choice	Philippines – Anita Rose Gomez

== Contestants ==
Forty-three contestants competed for the title.

Country/Territory	Contestant	Age	Hometown
Australia	Deborah Christine Madriaga	23	Campbelltown
Belgium	Jana Janssens	24	Brussels
Brazil	Isabela Fernandes	29	Minas Gerais
Cambodia	Mealyann Saing	29	Long Beach
Canada	Naomi Shotlander	19	Toronto
China	Yi Hong Ren	–	Beijing
Colombia	Patricia Diaz Escalante	25	Bogotá
Curaçao	Sherrylucia Cristina Morales	_	Willemstad
Dominican Republic	Charlyn Corona Cruz	29	La Vega
England	Monica Fernandes De Freitas	26	Cambridge
France	Océane Gryzon	24	Lille
Germany	Lisa Malasch-Erkens	28	Venray, Netherlands
Guam	Janey Nauta	30	Yigo
Honduras	Violeta Soto	22	Siguatepeque
Hong Kong	Chi Kwan Lau	–	Hong Kong
India	Danube Kangjam	25	New Delhi
Indonesia	Aisyah Amini	25	Medan
Japan	Kanako Matsuo	–	Tokyo
Luxembourg	Chiara Vanderveeren	28	Leuven
Macau	Alicia Mui	22	Macai
Malaysia	Sheena Shan	24	Selangor
Mexico	Mariana García Trejo	26	Ensenada
Mongolia	Baasansuren Budsuren	_	Ulanbataar
Morocco	Ghizlaine Nawar Shaoui	–	–
Nepal	Prapti Ranabhat	19	Pokhara
Netherlands	Elmira Wildboer	19	Amsterdam
New Zealand	Hannah Cross	21	Tauranga
Nigeria	Tracy Johnson	23	Abuja
Peru	Michella Whilar Lazarte	20	Piura
Philippines	Anita Rose Gomez	23	Subic
Romania	Elena Cristiana Gogelescu	–	–
Singapore	Krisha Raj	27	Singapore
South Africa	Bejandri Lourens	–	Boksburg
South Korea	Heewon Yang	_	Seoul
Spain	Merry Jane Isla Álvarez	23	_
Taiwan	Hsin Hui Chen	–	–
Thailand	Bawonrat Maneerat	28	Sa Kaeo
Turkey	Aylin Ev	–	–
Uganda	Thea Martha Bateeze	–	Jinja
United Kingdom	Anna Gomes	_	London
United States	Kayla Jane Usison	26	San Francisco
Vietnam	Dương Ngọc Ánh	28	Bắc Ninh
Zambia	Grace Tembo	_	_
