= Miss World Philippines 2024 =

12th Miss World Philippines pageant

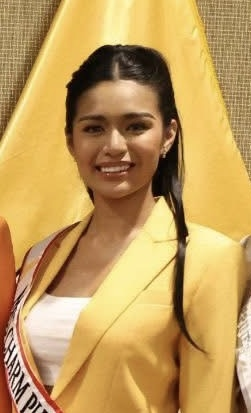
- Krishnah Gravidez
- Date: July 19, 2024
- Presenters: Billy Crawford; Maria Gigante; Teejay Marquez; Emmanuelle Vera
- Entertainment: The Juans; Manila Philharmonic Orchestra; Johnoy Danao; Kaia; Bilib; Alyssa Muhlach
- Venue: Mall of Asia Arena, Pasay, Philippines
- Entrants: 33
- Placements: 20
- Withdrawals: Laguna; Taguig
- Winner: Krishnah Gravidez; Baguio
- Best National Costume: Sophia Bianca Santos, Pampanga
- Photogenic: Krishnah Gravidez, Baguio

Miss World Philippines 2024 was the twelfth Miss World Philippines pageant, held at the SM Mall of Asia Arena in Pasay, Metro Manila, Philippines, on July 19, 2024.

Gwendolyne Fourniol of Negros Occidental crowned Krishnah Gravidez of Baguio at the end of the event. Gravidez represented the Philippines at the 72nd Miss World pageant, where she ended up as a top eight finalist and continental queen for Asia.

Contestants from thirty-three localities competed in this edition. The pageant was hosted by Billy Crawford, Maria Gigante, Teejay Marquez, and Emmanuelle Vera. The competition also featured the debut of “Rays of Hope,” a new crown designed by Oro China Jewelry. Filipino pop rock band The Juans, the Manila Philharmonic Orchestra, Johnoy Danao, Alyssa Muhlach and Filipino pop groups Kaia and Bilib performed in the finals. Miss World 2023 Krystyna Pyszková and Julia Morley also attended the coronation night.

== Background ==
SM Mall of Asia Arena, the venue of the event

=== Selection of participants ===
On August 23, 2023, the Miss World Philippines Organization announced that the organization is now accepting provincial directors who can handle the local franchise of the pageant. All candidates who won their local pageant or are appointed by their respective local franchise holder will automatically become candidates for Miss World Philippines.

On March 14, 2024, the organization launched its application for the next set of candidates who will compete alongside the contestants who were handpicked by their local franchise holder or won their local pageant. The final submission of the application was initially on April 12, 2024. However, on April 12, the organization extended their application deadline to April 22, 2024. The final screening occurred at the Glass Ballroom of Okada Manila on May 27, 2024. The contestants who passed the final screening and the local winners comprise this year's batch of contestants.

The thirty-five contestants were officially introduced to the media at the ballroom of Seda Manila Bay on June 22 during their official sashing ceremony. Starting this edition, candidates will not be numbered, and will instead use their respective localities as their designations.

==== Withdrawals ====
Among the thirty-five candidates introduced on June 22, two withdrew in the run-up to the pageant: Tanya Granados of Laguna and Paola Bagaforo of Taguig, with no reason given for their withdrawal.

== Results ==
=== Placements ===
==== Color keys ====
- The contestant won an international pageant.
- The contestant was a semi-finalist in an international pageant.

| Placement | Contestant | International Placement |
|---|---|---|
| Miss World Philippines 2024 | Baguio – Krishnah Gravidez | Top 8 – Miss World 2025 |
| 1st Princess | Tarlac – Jasmine Omay | |
| 2nd Princess | Pampanga – Sophia Bianca Santos | |
| Top 10 | Batangas – Patricia Bianca Tapia; Bicol Region – Jeanne Isabelle Bilasano; Cavite – Deanna Marie Maté; Kapitolyo, Pasig – Riana Agatha Pangindian; Manila – Gabrielle Marie Lantzer; Pangasinan – Nikki Buenafe Cheveh; Quezon – Maria Andrea Endicio | |
| Top 20 | Bacolod – Marianel Tan; Cebu – Sofi Maxim Margareta Grenmo; Central Visayas – Jewel Marisse Catherine Reyes; Concepcion, Tarlac – Angel Gutierrez; Dasmariñas, Cavite – Clytemestra Juan; Iloilo City – Arrieanna Zobelle Beron; Malaybalay, Bukidnon – Dolly Cruz; Marikina – Raine Africa; Quezon City – Christine Chagas; Zambales – Princess Kazel Oseo | |

=== Appointed titleholders ===
| Title | Delegate | International Placement |
|---|---|---|
| Miss Philippines Tourism 2024 | Batangas – Patricia Bianca Tapia | Special Title |
| Miss Multinational Philippines 2024 | Pangasinan – Nikki Buenafe Cheveh | Pageant not held |
| Face of Beauty Philippines 2024 | Bicol Region – Jeanne Isabelle Bilasano | Winner – Face of Beauty International 2024 |
| Reina Hispanoamericana Filipinas 2024 | Cavite – Dia Maté | Winner – Reina Hispanoamericana 2025 |
| Universal Woman Philippines 2025 | Tarlac – Jasmine Omay | Top 13 – Universal Woman 2025 |
| Miss Elite Philippines 2026 | Pampanga – Sophia Bianca Santos | Winner – Miss Elite 2026 |

=== Special awards ===
==== Major awards ====
| Award | Contestant |
|---|---|
| Best in Evening Gown | Baguio – Krishnah Gravidez |
| Best in Swimsuit | Baguio – Krishnah Gravidez |
| Miss Photogenic | Baguio – Krishnah Gravidez |

==== Minor/Sponsor awards ====
| Award | Contestant |
|---|---|
| Miss 9Young-Basic | Baguio – Krishnah Gravidez; Cavite – Deanna Marie Maté |
| Miss Aseana City | Tarlac – Jasmine Omay |
| Miss Aqua Boracay | Cavite – Deanna Marie Maté |
| Miss Bagin | Baguio – Krishnah Gravidez; Cavite – Deanna Marie Maté |
| Miss Bench | Baguio – Krishnah Gravidez |
| Miss Bench Active | Cavite – Deanna Marie Maté |
| Miss Bench Body | Kapitolyo, Pasig – Riana Agatha Pangindian; Pampanga – Sophia Bianca Santos |
| Miss Best Skin by Cathy Valencia | Baguio – Krishnah Gravidez |
| Miss C-Vitt | Zambales – Princess Kazel Oseo |
| Miss Dr. Leo | Baguio – Krishnah Gravidez |
| Miss Ever Bilena | Batangas – Patricia Bianca Tapia |
| Miss Forticare | Baguio – Krishnah Gravidez; Bicol Region – Jeanne Isabelle Bilasano |
| Miss GAOC Smile | Batangas – Patricia Bianca Tapia |
| Miss Hairfix | Baguio – Krishnah Gravidez |
| Miss Hello Glow | Baguio – Krishnah Gravidez |
| Miss Jojo Bragais | Baguio – Krishnah Gravidez |
| Miss Megaworld Hotels and Resorts | Baguio – Krishnah Gravidez |
| Miss Mestiza | Baguio – Krishnah Gravidez |
| Miss Oro China | Baguio – Krishnah Gravidez |
| Miss Philippine Airlines | Baguio – Krishnah Gravidez |
| Miss ProCap | Baguio – Krishnah Gravidez; Bicol – Jeanne Isabelle Bilasano; Cavite – Deanna Marie Maté |
| Miss Syduction International | Bicol – Jeanne Isabelle Bilasano |
| Miss Victoria Sports | Tarlac – Jasmine Omay |

== Fast-track events ==
=== Sports ===
On June 24, 2024, the ten semi-finalists for the Sports event were announced on the social media platforms of the Miss World Philippines Organization. The ten semi-finalists were determined through a series of events that took place on June 21. The winner who will be announced on July 19 will automatically have a spot in the semi-finals.

- Advanced to the Top 20 via the Sports challenge.

| Placement | Contestant |
|---|---|
| Winner | Cavite – Deanna Marie Maté |
| Top 10 | Cagayan – Jamaila Dumlao; Dasmariñas, Cavite – Clytemestra Juan; Don Salvador Benedicto – Precious Batiancila; Lucena, Quezon – Clare Azañes; Malaybalay, Bukidnon – Dolly Cruz; Manila – Gabrielle Marie Lantzer; Quezon – Maria Andrea Endicio; Surigao del Norte – Lance Marie Escalante; Tarlac – Jasmine Omay |

=== Beach Beauty ===
On June 27, 2024, the Beach Beauty event took place at Aqua Boracay in Malay, Aklan. The twelve semi-finalists were announced on the same event, and the winner who will be announced on July 19 will automatically have a spot in the semi-finals.

- Advanced to the Top 20 via the Beach Beauty challenge.

| Placement | Contestant |
|---|---|
| Winner | Pampanga – Sophia Bianca Santos |
| Top 12 | Baguio – Krishnah Gravidez; Batangas – Patricia Bianca Tapia; Bicol Region – Jeanne Isabelle Bilasano; Capiz – Mariam Lara Ashraf Abd El Hamid; Cavite – Deanna Marie Maté; Cebu – Sofi Maxim Margareta Grenmo; Iloilo City – Arrieanna Zobelle Beron; Kapitolyo, Pasig – Riana Agatha Pangindian; Manila – Gabrielle Marie Lantzer; Pangasinan – Nikki Buenafe Cheveh; Tarlac – Jasmine Omay |

=== Beauty with a Purpose ===
On July 1, 2024, the Beauty with a Purpose event took place at the Sequoia Hotel in Pasay. The ten semi-finalists were announced on the same event, and the two winners who will be announced on July 19 will automatically have a spot in the semi-finals.

- Advanced to the Top 20 via Beauty with a Purpose.

| Placement | Contestant |
|---|---|
| Winners | Bicol Region – Jeanne Isabelle Bilasano; Pangasinan – Nikki Buenafe Cheveh |
| Top 10 | Batangas – Patricia Bianca Tapia; Cavite – Deanna Marie Maté; Kapitolyo, Pasig – Riana Agatha Pangindian; Malaybalay, Bukidnon – Dolly Cruz; Quezon – Maria Andrea Endicio; Quezon City – Christine Chagas; Tarlac – Jasmine Omay; Zamboanga del Sur – Krishia Mendoza |

=== Head to Head ===
On July 8, 2024, the Head to Head Challenge finals took place at the Southville International School and Colleges Hotel in Las Pinas City where all candidates underwent in a series of extemporaneous speaking. The three finalists were announced on the same event, and the winner who will be announced on July 19 will automatically have a spot in the semi-finals.

- Advanced to the Top 20 via the Head to Head challenge.

| Placement | Contestant |
|---|---|
| Winner | Malaybalay, Bukidnon – Dolly Cruz |
| Top 3 | Batangas – Patricia Bianca Tapia; Tarlac – Jasmine Omay |
| Top 8 | Bacolod – Marianel Tan; Baguio – Krishnah Gravidez; Kapitolyo, Pasig – Riana Agatha Pangindian; Manila – Gabrielle Marie Lantzer; Quezon City – Christine Chagas |

=== Talent ===
- Advanced to the Top 20 via the Talent challenge.

| Placement | Contestant |
|---|---|
| Winner | Central Visayas – Jewel Marisse Catherine Reyes |
| Top 5 | Dasmariñas, Cavite – Clytemestra Juan; General Trias – Regina Angeline Patiag; Malaybalay, Bukidnon – Dolly Cruz; Zambales – Princess Kazel Oseo |

=== Best in National Costume ===
On July 17, 2024, the Best in National Costume competition alongside the charity gala took place at the Okada Manila in Parañaque. The three finalists for the Charity fas-track were announced on the same event, and the winner who will be announced on July 19 will automatically have a spot in the semi-finals.

- Advanced to the Top 20 via the Best in National Costume competition.

| Placement | Contestant |
|---|---|
| Winner | Pampanga – Sophia Bianca Santos |
| Top 10 | Baguio – Krishnah Gravidez; Cavite – Deanna Marie Maté; Kapitolyo, Pasig – Riana Agatha Pangindian; Malaybalay, Bukidnon – Dolly Cruz; Manila – Gabrielle Marie Lantzer; Pangasinan – Nikki Buenafe Cheveh; Quezon – Maria Andrea Endicio; Quezon City – Christine Chagas; Tarlac – Jasmine Omay |

=== Miss Charity ===
On July 17, 2024, the Top Model Fast-Track alongside the charity gala took place at the Okada Manila in Parañaque. The three finalists for the Charity fas-track were announced on the same event, and the winner who will be announced on July 19 will automatically have a spot in the semi-finals.

- Advanced to the Top 20 via the Charity challenge.

| Placement | Contestant |
|---|---|
| Winner | Cavite – Deanna Marie Maté |
| Top 3 | Pampanga – Sophia Bianca Santos; Quezon – Maria Andrea Endicio |

=== Miss Multimedia ===
On July 18, 2024, the six semi-finalists for the Multimedia fast-track were announced on the social media platforms of the Miss World Philippines Organization. The winner who will be announced on July 19 will automatically have a spot in the semi-finals.

- Advanced to the Top 20 via the Multimedia challenge.

| Placement | Contestant |
|---|---|
| Winner | Baguio – Krishnah Gravidez |
| Top 6 | Batangas – Patricia Bianca Tapia; Cavite – Deanna Marie Maté; Concepcion, Tarlac - Angel Gutierrez; Kapitolyo, Pasig – Riana Agatha Pangindian; Malaybalay, Bukidnon – Dolly Cruz |

=== Top Model ===
On July 17, 2024, the Top Model Fast-Track alongside the charity gala took place at the Okada Manila in Parañaque. The ten finalists for the Top Model fas-track were announced on the same event, and the winner who will be announced on July 19 will automatically have a spot in the semi-finals.

- Advanced to the Top 20 via the Top Model challenge.

| Placement | Contestant |
|---|---|
| Winner | Baguio – Krishnah Gravidez |
| Top 10 | Bicol Region – Jeanne Isabelle Bilasano; Cavite – Deanna Marie Maté; Kapitolyo, Pasig – Riana Agatha Pangindian; Malaybalay, Bukidnon – Dolly Cruz; Manila – Gabrielle Marie Lantzer; Pangasinan – Nikki Buenafe Cheveh; Quezon – Maria Andrea Endicio; Quezon City – Christine Chagas; Tarlac – Jasmine Omay |

== Pageant ==
=== Format ===
The number of semi-finalists for this edition was retained to twenty. Seven of the twenty are fast-track challenge winners which automatically secured them a spot in the semi-finals, while thirteen were selected through various preliminary activities. The twenty semi-finalists competed at the personal interview competition, swimsuit competition, and evening gown competition, and ten finalists were selected afterwards. The ten finalists were competed at the question-and-answer portion of the competition, after which Miss World Philippines 2024 and the two princesses were announced.

=== Board of judges ===
- Kirk Bondad – Mister World Philippines 2022
- Carlo Co – Chief Operating Officer of Aqua Boracay
- Sunshine Cruz – Filipina actress
- Tina Cuevas – Philanthropist, hotelier, and socialite
- Laura Lehmann – Miss World Philippines 2017
- Tracy Perez – Miss World Philippines 2021
- Krystyna Pyszková – Miss World 2023 from the Czech Republic
- Daisy Reyes – Filipina actress, Binibining Pilipinas-World 1996
- Andy Regalado – Chief Sales and Marketing Officer of Banyan Tree Manila Bay
- Queenierich Rehman – Miss World Philippines 2012
- Vince Rodriguez
- Charly Suarez – Filipino professional boxer; IBO & IBF Intercontinental Super Featherweight champion

== Contestants ==
Thirty-three contestants competed for the title.

| Province/City | Contestant | Age (Note: Ages at the time of the pageant) | Notes |
|---|---|---|---|
| Baco, Oriental Mindoro | Maria Sophia Torino | 22 | |
| Bacolod | Marianel Tan | 19 | |
| Baguio | Krishnah Gravidez | 23 | Resigned as Miss Charm Philippines 2024; Crowned Miss World Asia 2025 |
| Batangas | Patricia Bianca Tapia | 26 | Top 20 semi-finalist at Miss Universe Philippines 2024 |
| Benguet | Eula Arielle Paltep | 22 | |
| Bicol Region | Jeanne Isabelle Bilasano | 26 | Top 11 semi-finalist at Binibining Pilipinas 2023 |
| Cagayan | Jamaila Dumlao | – | |
| Caniogan, Pasig | Sheikanah Jones Tamayo | – | |
| Capiz | Mariam Lara Ashraf Abd El Hamid | 26 | |
| Cavite | Deanna Marie Maté | 22 | Competed at Miss Universe Philippines 2024 |
| Cebu | Sofi Maxim Margareta Grenmo | 19 | |
| Central Visayas | Jerica Jewel Marisse Catherine Reyes | – | |
| Concepcion, Tarlac | Angel Gutierrez | – | |
| Dasmariñas | Clytemestra Miaflor Juan | 24 | |
| Davao del Sur | Jane Darren Genobisa | 27 | Competed at Binibining Pilipinas 2022; Top 25 semi-finalist at Binibining Pilipinas 2019 |
| Don Salvador Benedicto | Precious Batiancila | – | |
| General Trias | Regina Angeline Patiag | 22 | |
| Guimaras | Kara Athena de Leon | 20 | |
| Iloilo | Dilme Amanda Perera | – | |
| Iloilo City | Arrieanna Zobelle Beron | 18 | |
| Kapitolyo, Pasig | Riana Agatha Pangindian | 27 | First Princess at Miss World Philippines 2021 |
| Lucena | Clare Alexandra Azañes | 21 | |
| Malaybalay, Bukidnon | Dolly Cruz | 22 | |
| Manila | Gabrielle Marie Lantzer | 19 | |
| Marikina | Raine Africa | – | |
| Pampanga | Sophia Bianca Santos | 20 | |
| Pangasinan | Nikki Buenafe Cheveh | 22 | |
| Quezon | Maria Andrea Endicio | 24 | Top 14 semi-finalist at Binibining Pilipinas 2025 |
| Quezon City | Christine Chagas | – | |
| Surigao del Norte | Lance Marie Escalante | 21 | |
| Tarlac | Jasmine Omay | 23 | Top 12 semi-finalist at Binibining Pilipinas 2022 |
| Zambales | Princess Kazel Oseo | – | |
| Zamboanga del Sur | Krishia Benedict Mendoza | – | |
