= Nikki Buenafe Cheveh =

Filipino-Iranian model (born 2003)

- Born: Nikhisah Buenafe; June 4, 2003 (age 23); Binmaley, Pangasinan, Philippines
- Education: University of Santo Tomas (AB)
- Height: 173 cm (5 ft 8 in)
- Beauty pageant titleholder
- Title: Miss Multinational Philippines 2024; Face of Beauty International Philippines 2025; Face of Beauty International 2025
- Major competitions: Miss World Philippines 2024; (Top 10); (Miss Multinational Philippines 2024); Miss Grand Philippines 2025; (Top 15); (Face of Beauty International Philippines 2025); Face of Beauty International 2025; (Winner)

Nikhisah "Nikki" Buenafe (born June 4, 2003) is a Filipino-Iranian model, actress, singer and beauty pageant titleholder who was crowned Face of Beauty International 2025. She became the second Filipino winner after Jeanne Isabelle Bilasano's victory in 2024, securing the first back-to-back title in the pageant's history.

Buenafe was previously crowned as 2023 Limgas na Pangasinan, becoming Pangasinan's representative at the Miss World Philippines 2024 where she was crowned as Miss Multinational Philippines 2024. She then competed at Miss Grand Philippines 2025 representing Quezon City, where she was crowned as Face of Beauty Philippines 2025.

== Early life ==
Buenafe was born on June 4, 2003, in Binmaley, Pangasinan to an Iranian father and a Filipino mother. She then pursued her AB Asian Studies degree from the University of Santo Tomas.

== Pageantry ==
=== Limgas na Pangasinan 2023 ===
Buenafe represented Binmaley at Limgas na Pangasinan 2023 where she won the competition, becoming Pangasinan's representative in the Miss World Philippines 2024 competition.

=== Miss World Philippines 2024 ===
Buenafe competed at the Miss World Philippines 2024 competition representing Pangasinan where Krishnah Gravidez of Baguio won the title.

At the end of the pageant, she was crowned as Miss Multinational Philippines 2024.

=== Miss Grand Philippines 2025 ===
Buenafe competed at the Miss Grand Philippines 2025 competition as Miss Multinational did not stage its 2024 edition. She represented Quezon City due to Pangasinan's pre-selected representative for the competition from the Limgas na Pangasinan pageant.

At the end of the event, she was crowned as Face of Beauty International Philippines 2025 by Face of Beauty International 2024 Jeanne Isabelle Bilasano.

=== Face of Beauty International 2025 ===
Buenafe represented the Philippines at the Face of Beauty International 2025 competition in Taichiung, Taiwan.

At the end of the event, Cheveh was crowned as Face of Beauty International 2025 by outgoing titleholder Jeanne Isabelle Bilasano, securing the first ever back-to-back victory in the pageant's history.

Awards and achievements
| Preceded by Jeanna Isabelle Bilasano | Face of Beauty International; 2025 | Succeeded by Pitchayawi Yokoyama |
| Preceded by Jeanna Isabelle Bilasano (Albay) | Face of Beauty International Philippines; 2025 | Succeeded by Beatriz Angela Ocampo (Antipolo City) |
