= Face of Beauty International 2025 =

11th edition of Face of Beauty International

- Nikki Buenafe
- Date: November 30, 2025
- Venue: Taichung, Taiwan
- Entrants: 33
- Placements: 5
- Winner: Nikki Buenafe Cheveh; Philippines
- Best National Costume: Suppanika Nopparat; Thailand
- Photogenic: Martina Scauri; Switzerland
- Friendship: Juliëtte Disco; Netherlands

Face of Beauty International 2025 was the 11th edition of the Face of Beauty International pageant, held on November 30, 2025, in Taichung, Taiwan. Contestants from various countries and territories competed for the title.

At the end of the event, Nikki Buenafe Cheveh of the Philippines was crowned the winner by her predecessor, Jeanne Isabelle Bilasano, marking the Philippines' second consecutive victory in the competition.

The edition also featured the Teen Face of Beauty International competition, in which Léa Voyame of Italy was crowned the winner. She succeeded Elvia Marie Torres Sanchez of Puerto Rico.

== Background ==
Face of Beauty International 2025 edition was held in Taiwan, with activities taking place from November 20 to December 2, 2025. The competition brought together 33 contestants representing different countries and territories for a series of preliminary activities and events highlighting culture, tourism, and advocacy.

The preliminary activities included a talent competition in Kaohsiung and a swimwear competition in Tainan, while contestants also participated in cultural and tourism activities across Taiwan. The final competition was held on November 30 at Taichung, where the titleholders of both the main and teen divisions were announced.

The 2025 edition was held in Taichung, Taiwan, and featured both the main Face of Beauty International competition and the Teen Face of Beauty International competition.

== Results ==
Countries and territories represented among the placements at Face of Beauty International 2025.

Participating nations that won from 2013 to 2025.

=== Placements ===
Placement	Contestant	Country/Territory	Ref.
Face of Beauty International 2025	Nikki Buenafe Cheveh	Philippines	
First runner-up	Lucy Dimitrova	Sweden	
Second runner-up	Julia Podkolina	Finland	
Third runner-up	Jing Mun Phan	Malaysia	
Fourth runner-up	Suppanika Nopparat	Thailand	
Top 10	Turia Ahlawat	India	
Top 10	Léa Voyame	Italy	
Top 10	Martina Scauri	Switzerland	
Top 10	Nitya Roux	Mauritius	
Top 10	Han May Myat Yoon	Myanmar	

=== Teen category ===
Placement	Contestant	Country/Territory	Ref.
Teen Face of Beauty International 2025	Léa Voyame	Italy	
First runner-up	Turia Ahlawat	India	
Second runner-up	Nitya Roux	Mauritius	
Third runner-up	Anita Vicente	Portugal	
Fourth runner-up	Diana Krivosheyeva	Belarus	

=== Special awards ===
The following special awards were presented during the competition.

Award	Recipient	Country/Territory	Ref.
I AM ME Award	Martina Scauri	Switzerland	
Miss Photogenic	Martina Scauri	Switzerland	
Face of Beauty Universe	Maria de los Angeles Feican Perez	Ecuador	
Face of Beauty World	Juliëtte Disco	Netherlands	
Miss Friendship	Juliëtte Disco	Netherlands	
Face of Beauty Earth	Shihya Chen	Taiwan	
Best in Interview	Julia Podkolina	Finland	
Best in National Costume	Suppanika Nopparat	Thailand	
Best in Evening Gown	Suppanika Nopparat	Thailand	
Best in Swimwear	Suppanika Nopparat	Thailand	

== Contestants ==
A total of 33 contestants competed in the Face of Beauty International 2025, representing countries and territories from around the world.

No.	Contestant	Country/Territory	Ref.
1	Diana Krivosheyeva	Belarus	
2	Jade Dubois	Belgium	
3	Hellena da Fonseca Magno	Brazil	
4	Maria de los Angeles Feican Perez	Ecuador	
5	Henel Vare	Estonia	
6	Julia Podkolina	Finland	
7	Nina Togbedji	France	
8	Chrislynn Barroga	Hawaii, United States	
9	Turia Ahlawat	India	
10	Léa Voyame	Italy	
11	Reina Mizutani	Japan	
12	Azhar Zhumabekova	Kazakhstan	
13	Jing Mun Phan	Malaysia	
14	Nitya Roux	Mauritius	
15	Han May Myat Yoon	Myanmar	
16	Tessany Esterhuizen	Namibia	
17	Juliëtte Disco	Netherlands	
18	Mercedes Budd	New Zealand	
19	Nikki Buenafe Cheveh	Philippines	
20	Anita Vicente	Portugal	
21	Polina Pervyh	Russia	
22	Olesia Matsiboruk	Siberia, Russia	
23	Danica van Deventer	South Africa	
24	Cho Hayoung	South Korea	
25	Nilushi Pawanya Asarappulige	Sri Lanka	
26	Lucy Dimitrova	Sweden	
27	Martina Scauri	Switzerland	
28	Lilia Nyrova	Tatarstan, Russia	
29	Shihya Chen	Taiwan	
30	Supphanika Nopparat	Thailand	
31	Tina Vaka	Tonga	
32	Orgaadai Kyrgys	Tuva, Russia	
33	Lara Nichole Manaog Mercurio	United States	
