= Miss Grand International 2026 =

14th Miss Grand International beauty pageant

- Jihan Dimack
- Date: 10 October 2026
- Presenters: Matthew Deane; Isabella Menin; Luciana Fuster; CJ Opiaza; Vanessa Pulgarin; Hương Giang
- Venue: MGI Hall, Bangkok, Thailand
- Broadcaster: YouTube
- Entrants: 77
- Placements: 25
- Withdrawals: Angola; Argentina; Denmark; Germany; Hungary; Iceland; Kyrgyzstan; Martinique; North Macedonia; Palestine; Panama; Sweden; Trinidad and Tobago; United States Virgin Islands; Zambia
- Returns: Bangladesh; Chile; Côte d'Ivoire; Honduras; Iran; Lebanon; Moldova; Mongolia; Norway; Pakistan; Romania; Russia; Sierra Leone; South Sudan; Uruguay
- Winner: Jihan Dimack; Tanzania
- Best National Costume: Xuebing Liu (Hong Kong); Zara Younus (Pakistan); Angelica Lopez (Philippines); Patthama Jitsawat (Thailand)
- Best in Swimsuit: Marlène Kouassi (Côte d'Ivoire)

External videos
- Grand Final
- Preliminary Competition

Miss Grand International 2026 was the 14th Miss Grand International pageant, held at the MGI Hall in Bangkok, Thailand, on 10 October 2026.

Jihan Dimack of Tanzania won the competition, succeeding Emma Tiglao of the Philippines. She is the first African and Tanzanian to win the title. Dimack is also the second Black woman to win the competition after Abena Appiah won in 2020.

Contestants from 77 countries and territories competed for the title.

== Background ==
=== Location and date ===
On 18 October 2025 at Miss Grand International 2025, India was announced as the host country for the 2026 contest in October 2026. Events would be held across three cities: Jaipur, Agra, and New Delhi. It was later announced announced that the New Delhi venue would be the Indira Gandhi Arena in New Delhi, with contestants arriving on 18 September. On 26 August, the organizers announced the competition schedule, with the national costume show scheduled for 5 October, the preliminary competition for 7 October, and the final competition for 10 October.

On 3 September 2026, the Miss Grand International (MGI) announced that all events in India had been discontinued, and would be relocated to the MGI Hall in Bangkok, Thailand. The decision followed the host country’s failure to fulfill its contractual obligations and meet the standards agreed upon with Miss Grand International. The agreement had stipulated five-star standards for both hospitality and production throughout the competition. After discussions and efforts to resolve the issues, the Miss Grand International Organization stated that the required standards had not been met, terminated its activities in India, and moved the contest to Thailand.

=== Selection of participants ===
Three participants were appointed to compete as the runner-up in their national pageant. Hana Dědková of the Czech Republic was the first runner-up in Miss Grand Czech Republic 2026. Vyan Trisni of Malaysia was the first runner-up in Miss Grand Malaysia 2026 Victoria Oluwakotanmi of the United States was the first runner-up in Miss Grand United States 2026. Four were selected to replace an original winner.

The license holders in Luxembourg, and Morocco paid their franchise fees but will not send representatives to compete.

==== Replacements ====
Hyun-jin Kim of South Korea was replaced by Lang Sa for undisclosed reasons. Sara Gouda of Egypt was succeeded by Menna El Batran following a change in the license holder. Rebecca Attiogbe of Ghana, Minshi Lin of Macau, Erica Iren Vihovde of Norway were replaced by Adelaide Somuah, Moniece Lam, and Ayu Zhafira Kynbråten.

==== Returns and withdrawals ====
South Sudan returned having last competed in 2017; Moldova, Norway and Sierra Leone in 2018; Lebanon in 2019; Iran and Uruguay in 2020; Mongolia in 2022; Romania in 2023; and Bangladesh, Chile, Côte d'Ivoire, Honduras, Pakistan, and Russia in 2024.

Matangaro Tarabay of the Cook Islands, Rufina Gasanova of Kyrgyzstan, Sarah-Louisa Rohrer of Switzerland, Maria Kolotilo of Ukraine, Brianna Stern of the United States Virgin Islands, and Charity Mumba of Zambia withdrew from the competition.

== Results ==
=== Placements ===
Placement	Contestants
Miss Grand International 2026	Tanzania – Jihan Dimack (Note: Automatically advanced to the Top 25 through public vote)
1st Runner-Up	Ecuador – Shyare Andrade (Note: Automatically advanced to the Top 25 as the Country's Power of the Year) (Note: Automatically advanced to the top 5 as Miss Popular vote)
2nd Runner-Up	Netherlands – Beau Megan Goos
3rd Runner-Up	Guatemala – Ximena Carrillo
4th Runner-Up	Vietnam – Emoura Phạm
5th Runners-Up	Côte d'Ivoire – Marlène Kouassi; Cuba – Alyanni Gómez; Mexico – Pety Juárez; Puerto Rico – Vicky Carbonell (Note: Automatically advanced to the Top 25 as Grand Talent winner); Thailand – Patthama Jitsawat (Note: Automatically advanced to the Top 11 through public vote); Venezuela – Lady Di Mosquera
Top 25	Belgium – Emily Baesen; Chile – Ignacia Michelson; China – Mengmeng Liu; Costa Rica – Catalina Murillo; Czech Republic – Hana Dědková; Honduras – Emely Alemán; Malaysia – Vyan Trisni; Nigeria – Uzogheli Christobelle; Paraguay – Micaela Viveros; Peru – Zuliet Seminario; Philippines – Angelica Lopez; Spain – Alba María Ruiz; United States – Victoria Oluwakotanmi; Uruguay – Francie Millán

=== Special awards ===
Award	Contestant
Best in Swimsuit	Côte d'Ivoire – Marlène Kouassi
Best National Costume	Hong Kong – Xuebing Liu; Pakistan – Zara Younus; Philippines – Angelica Lopez; Thailand – Patthama Jitsawat
Country's Power of the Year	Ecuador – Shyare Andrade
Grand Talent	Puerto Rico – Vicky Carbonell
Miss Popular Vote	Tanzania – Jihan Dimack

=== Director awards ===
Award	Recipient
Golden Grand Award	Miss Grand Tanzania – Nazimizye Mdolo
Silver Grand Award	Miss Grand Japan – Eriko Yoshii; Reina Filipinas – Jojo Bragais

== Pageant ==
The pageant was broadcast on GrandTV’s YouTube channel.

=== Format ===
There were 77 contestants at the final. Twenty-five advanced to the semi-final, including the three fast-track winners of the Grand Talent, Country Power of the Year, and Miss Popular Vote contests. The remaining twenty-one were selected by the judges. The semi-finalists competed in the swimsuit round.

Eleven contestants advanced to the evening gown competition and the "Stop the War" speech segment, with ten selected by the judges and one by online public voting. Four of the final five were selected by the judges and one by online public voting. The winner and runners-up were announced following the final question-and-answer round.

== Pre-pageant events ==
=== Grand Talent contest ===
The preliminary round was held on 24 September, with the contestants narrowed down to fifteen and then to seven on the same day. The seven finalists competed in the final round at the MGI Hall, with the winner automatically qualifying for the Top 25 at the final.

Placement	Contestant
Winner	Puerto Rico – Vicky Carbonell
Top 7	Czech Republic – Hana Dědková; Dominican Republic – Keitty Familia; Japan – Sara Chiba; Moldova – Regina Ganzenko; Montenegro – Andrijana Delibašić; United States – Victoria Oluwakotanmi
Top 15	Ecuador – Shyare Andrade; Honduras – Emely Alemán; Mexico – Pety Juárez; Singapore – Nicole Bacon; South Africa – Estèe-Mari Smit; Spain – Alba María Ruiz; Thailand – Patthama Jitsawat; Vietnam – Emoura Phạm

=== Country Power of the Year ===
The "Country Power of the Year" fast-track winner was determined through public voting on social media. The first round narrowed the contestants down to 40 and concluded on 27 September. These were then divided into four groups of 10, with another round of voting selecting two contestants from each group. This round concluded on 30 September. The remaining eight contestants then advanced to the third round, where the top four were determined through paid voting on the official website. Votes from this round also counted toward the "Miss Popular Vote" competition.

In the quarter-final round, public voting was conducted through social media, with three of the remaining four contestants advancing to the semi-final round. The final two contestants were then determined through paid voting on the official website. The overall winner automatically advanced to the Top 25.

Placement	Contestant
Winner	Ecuador – Shyare Andrade
Top 2	Tanzania – Jihan Dimack
Top 3	Vietnam – Emoura Phạm
Top 4	Chile – Ignacia Michelson
Top 8	Guatemala – Ximena Carrillo; Pakistan – Zara Younus; Paraguay – Micaela Viveros; Philippines – Angelica Lopez
Top 40	Côte d'Ivoire – Marlène Kouassi

=== National Costume competition ===
The Best National Costume Award competition was held on 7 October at the MGI Hall and livestreamed on the pageant's official YouTube channel, GrandTV. The event was hosted by four former Miss Grand International titleholders, including Isabella Menin, Luciana Fuster, CJ Opiaza, and Emma Tiglao. Fifteen costumes advanced to the next round of judging; five selected through social media voting, five through voting on the pageant's website, and five by the judges.

This year, there were four winners of the National Costume Award, one from social media, one from the Miss Grand International website, and one from the judges, and were announced on stage during the finals.

Placement		Contestant
Winners		Hong Kong – Xuebing Liu; Pakistan – Zara Younus; Philippines – Angelica Lopez; Thailand – Patthama Jitsawat
Top 15	Social Media Vote	Chile – Ignacia Michelson; Ecuador – Shyare Andrade; Indonesia – Dilza Salsabila; Vietnam – Emoura Phạm
Top 15	Website Vote	Guatemala – Ximena Carrillo; Haiti – Estephanie Charles; Tanzania – Jihan Dimack
Top 15	Judge's Choice	China – Mengmeng Liu; Nepal – Sumnima Puri; Romania – Andreea Ciucă; Uruguay – Francie Millán

== Contestants ==
Country/Territory	Contestant	Age (Note: Ages at the time of the pageant)	Hometown	Ref.
Albania	Sara Shehu	22	Tirana	
Armenia	Amest Arutiunian	25	Sisian	
Australia	Cat Jane Shepherd	26	Perth	
Bangladesh	Anonna Fatima	25	Chittagong	
Belgium	Emily Baesen	21	Bierges	
Bolivia	Kaithlyn da Rocha	27	Cochabamba	
Brazil	Paula Assunção	33	Foz do Iguaçu	
Canada	Patricia Seward	29	Vancouver	
Chile	Ignacia Michelson	33	Santiago	
China	Mengmeng Liu	24	Suzhou	
Colombia	María Paula Berrio	20	Cartagena	
Costa Rica	Catalina Murillo	28	Heredia	
Côte d'Ivoire	Marlène Kouassi	27	Aboisso	
Cuba	Alyanni Gómez	25	Guanajay	
Czech Republic	Hana Dědková	25	Ostrava	
Dominican Republic	Keitty Familia	19	Santo Domingo	
Ecuador	Shyare Andrade	23	Portoviejo	
Egypt	Menna El Batran	22	Cairo	
El Salvador	Valeria Amaya	19	Santa Tecla	
France	Axelle Varin	20	Honfleur	
Georgia	Ioanna Shervashidze	18	Tbilisi	
Ghana	Adelaide Somuah	29	Kwahu	
Guatemala	Ximena Carrillo	22	Guatemala City	
Guyana	Khadesia Walker	27	New Haven	
Haiti	Estephanie Charles	26	Puerto Plata	
Honduras	Emely Alemán	27	Catacamas	
Hong Kong	Xuebing Liu	27	Kowloon	
India	Lakshita Thilagaraj	23	Chennai	
Indonesia	Dilza Salsabila	25	Batam	
Iran	Tanin Alemi Baygy	26	Tehran	
Italy	Angelica Marziali	27	Civitavecchia	
Jamaica	Simone Gardner	30	Kingston	
Japan	Sara Chiba	21	Higashiura	
Kazakhstan	Anel Yemel	28	Almaty	
Kosovo	Alba Fazlija	17	Pristina	
Laos	Louise Chanthalangsy	24	Vientiane	
Lebanon	Perla Abou Rjeily	24	Beirut	
Macau	Moniece Lam	23		
Malaysia	Vyan Trisni	22	Selangor	
Malta	Natalia Galea	27	Birkirkara	
Mexico	Pety Juárez	29	Angostura	
Moldova	Regina Ganzenko	24	Chișinău	
Mongolia	Amber Yuhan	24	Qingdao	
Montenegro	Andrijana Delibašić	26	Podgorica	
Myanmar	Christine Nan Seng	20	Hpakant	
Nepal	Sumnima Puri	23	Birendranagar	
Netherlands	Beau Megan Goos	22	Groningen	
New Zealand	Emily Faulkner	22	Dunedin	
Nicaragua	Nahomy Hill	27	Managua	
Nigeria	Uzogheli Christobelle	21	Lagos	
Norway	Ayu Zhafira Kynbråten	23	Lørenskog	
Pakistan	Zara Younus	25	Islamabad	
Paraguay	Micaela Viveros	21	Pedro Juan Caballero	
Peru	Zuliet Seminario	26	Arequipa	
Philippines	Angelica Lopez	25	Bataraza	
Portugal	Milena Rabelo	27	Lisbon	
Puerto Rico	Vicky Carbonell	24	Toa Baja	
Romania	Andreea Ciucă	27	Râmnicu Vâlcea	
Russia	Polina Ammosova	24	Saratov	
Sierra Leone	Adel Caroline Jusu	24	Pujehun	
Singapore	Nicole Bacon	23	Toa Payoh	
Slovakia	Viktória Kloknerová	21	Pezinok	
South Africa	Estèe-Mari Smit	18	Roodepoort	
South Korea	Lang Sa	28	Seoul	
South Sudan	Akoi Arok	29	Melbourne	
Spain	Alba María Ruiz	22	Baeza	
Sri Lanka	Nethaki Lokugamage	20	Colombo	
Taiwan	Xingxue Yan	25	Taipei	
Tanzania	Jihan Dimack	30	Dar es Salaam	
Thailand	Patthama Jitsawat	33	Surin	
Turkey	Ronika Başaran	19	Alanya	
United Kingdom	Pooja Ghodekar	25	Central London	
United States	Victoria Oluwakotanmi	25	San Antonio	
Uruguay	Francie Millán	24	New Orleans	
Venezuela	Lady Di Mosquera	26	Carora	
Vietnam	Emoura Phạm	26	Ho Chi Minh City	
Zimbabwe	Shelly Usman	27	Lekki	
