= Miss Grand International 2018 =

6th Miss Grand International Competition, beauty pageant edition

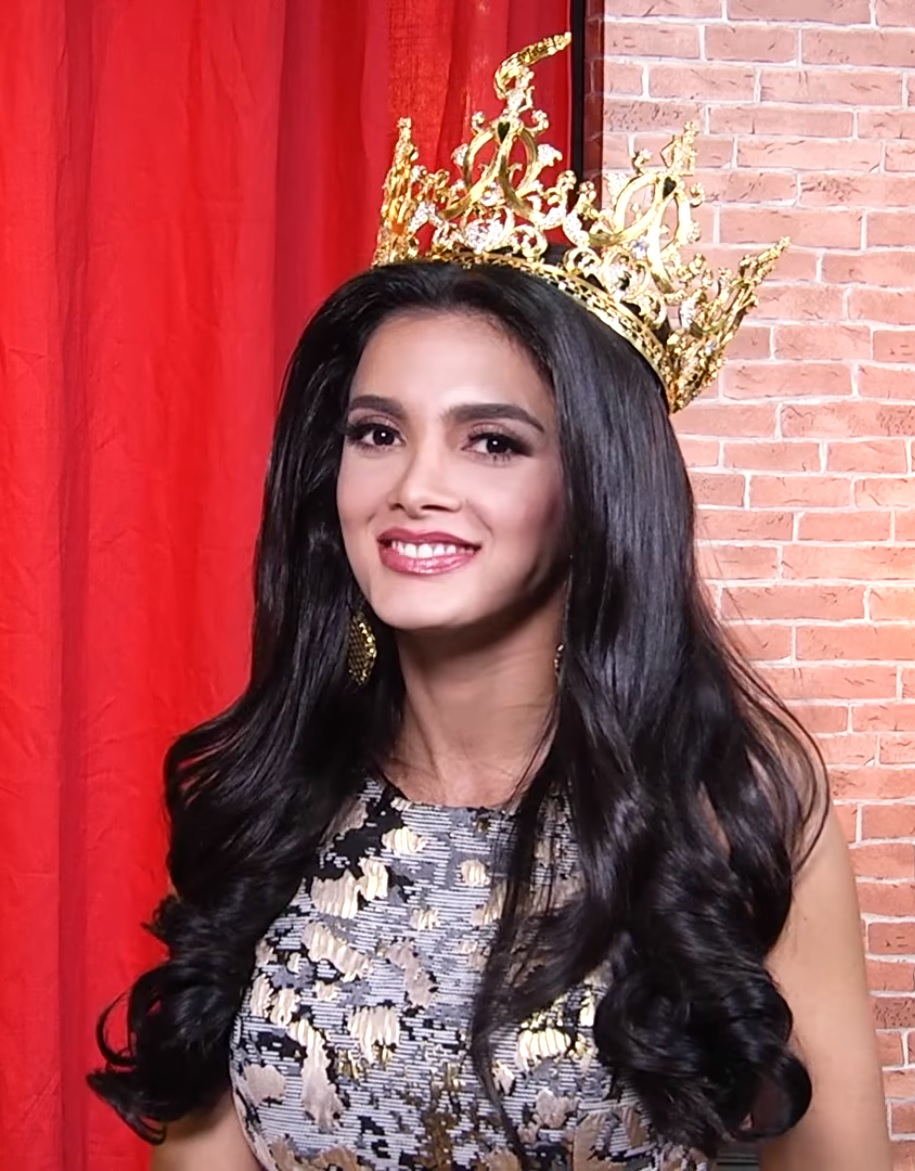
- Clara Sosa
- Date: October 25, 2018
- Presenters: Xian Lim
- Venue: The One Entertainment Park, Yangon, Myanmar
- Broadcaster: Facebook live; WSM; MWD Series; MVM; MV Lao HD; TV3; Direc TV Network; MV Fivel; LetViet
- Entrants: 75
- Placements: 21
- Debuts: Cape Verde; Cook Islands; Zambia
- Withdrawals: Bahamas; Belarus; Egypt; Fiji; France; Guatemala; Hungary; Lithuania; Nicaragua; Nigeria; Northern Ireland; Serbia; Slovakia; South Sudan; Uganda
- Returns: Albania; El Salvador; Ghana; Kazakhstan; Kosovo; Moldova; Norway; Poland; Suriname; Taiwan
- Winner: Clara Sosa; Paraguay
- Best National Costume: Andrea Moberg, Peru

Miss Grand International 2018 was the sixth Miss Grand International pageant, held at the One Entertainment Park in Yangon, Myanmar, on October 25, 2018.

María José Lora of Peru crowned Clara Sosa of Paraguay as her successor at the end of the event.

== Background ==
=== Date and venue ===
Two months after Miss Grand International 2017, the pageant organization announced that the next edition of the contest would be held in Yangoon, Myanmar on October 25, 2018.

=== Selection of participants ===
Contestants from 75 countries and territories were selected to compete in the competition. Thirty-one of these delegates were determined through the national pageant. Fourteen were appointed to their positions after being runner-ups in their national pageant or being selected through a casting process. Thirty delegates were appointed to the title without participating in any respective national pageants in this particular year.

The original representatives of Albania, Canada, Colombia, Kosovo, and Spain, who were elected through the national pageant, resigned from the titles, and caused the national directors to promote the runner-up to the title or appoint another delegate as replacement. The representatives of Bahamas, Namibia, and Singapore, were also elected through the national pageants, did not enter the pageant, and no replacements were assigned.

The representatives of Guatemala and Honduras were also appointed to participate but did not compete for undisclosed reasons. Miss Grand Lithuania, Jūratė Stasiūnaitė, withdrew during the pageant for personal reasons.

== Results ==
=== Placements ===
Placement	Contestant
Miss Grand International 2018	Paraguay – Clara Sosa
1st Runner-Up	India – Meenakshi Chaudhary
2nd Runner-Up	Indonesia – Nadia Purwoko
3rd Runner-Up	Puerto Rico – Nicole Colón
4th Runner-Up	Japan – Haruka Oda
Top 10	Dominican Republic – Meyté Brito; Mexico – Lezly Díaz; Spain – Patricia López; Venezuela – Biliannis Alvarez; Vietnam – Bùi Phương Nga §
Top 20	Australia – Kimberly Gundani; Brazil – Gabrielle Vilela; Costa Rica – Nicole Menayo; Cuba – Gladys Carredeguas; Kazakhstan – Aim Isengalieva; New Zealand – Hayley Robinson; Peru – Andrea Moberg; Russia – Talia Aibedullina; Sri Lanka – Pawani Vithanage; Sweden – Hanna Louise Haag; Thailand – Nam-oey Chanaphan

§ – Voted into the Top 10 by viewers and awarded as Miss Popular Vote

=== Special awards ===
Award	Contestant
Best National Costume	Peru – Andrea Moberg
Best Evening Gown	Thailand – Nam-oey Chanaphan
Best in Swimsuit	Cuba – Gladys Carredeguas
Best in Social Media	Indonesia – Nadia Purwoko
Miss Popular Vote	Vietnam – Bùi Phương Nga

== Pageant ==
=== Format ===
In the grand final round on October 25, after an introduction section, twenty-one contestants, who were selected through the preliminary round held on October 23 as well as all pre-pageant scorings, qualified for the quarterfinal round, in which each of the qualified candidates competed in the swimsuit. The score from the quarterfinals, as well as all previous accumulation scores, determined the nine semifinal finalists, together with the winner of the Miss Popular vote, which was elected through public voting, completed the top ten.

The ten finalists competed against each other in the evening gown and speech session, then the final five were selected to continue in the question and answer portion, in which the winner and all four runners-up were determined.

The panel of judges in the preliminary round, including:

- Nawat Itsaragrisil – President of Miss Grand International
- Teresa Chaivisut – Vice president of Miss Grand International
- Janelee Chaparro – Miss Grand International 2013 from Puerto Rico
- Lees García – Miss Grand International 2014 from Cuba
- Claire Elizabeth Parker – Miss Grand International 2015 from Australia
- Ariska Putri Pertiwi – Miss Grand International 2016 from Indonesia
- Ivan Gunawan – Indonesian television personality and fashion designer

== Contestants ==
75 contestants competed for the title

Country/Territory	Delegate	Age	Hometown
Albania	Klaudia Kalia	18	Tirana
Argentina	Julieta Riveros	21	Cordoba
Australia	Kimberly Gundani	26	Melbourne
Belgium	Elisabeth Moszkowicz	26	Brussels
Bolivia	Elena Romero	19	Chuquisaca
Brazil	Gabrielle Vilela	26	Rio de Janeiro
Bulgaria	Beloslava Yordanova	22	Sofia
Cambodia	Lika Dy	20	Kampong Chhnang
Canada	Grace Diamani	25	Ontario
Cape Verde	Prissy Gomes	25	Tarrafal
Chile	María Catalina Flores Vargas	23	Santiago
China	Wanxin Xing	24	Beijing
Colombia	Sheyla Quizena	21	Barranquilla
Cook Islands	Teau McKenzie	23	Avarua
Costa Rica	Nicole Menayo	24	Heredia
Cuba	Gladys Carredeguas	25	Havana
Czech Republic	Kristýna Langová	19	Prague
Denmark	Natasja Kunde	17	Copenhagen
Dominican Republic	Mayté Brito	27	San Cristobal
Ecuador	Blanca Arambulo	28	Guayaquil
El Salvador	Génesis Fuentes	24	San Salvador
England	Christina Baker	23	London
Estonia	Karolin Kippasto	22	Tartu
Ethiopia	Samrawit Azmeraw	23	Addis Ababa
Finland	Erika Helin	24	Helsinki
Germany	Mona Schafnitzl	24	Bavaria
Ghana	Helen Matey	24	Accra
Guadeloupe	Méghan Monrose	24	Saint-Claude
Haiti	Valierie Alcide	23	Port-au-Prince
Hong Kong	Eleanor Lam	24	Hong Kong
India	Meenakshi Chaudhary	21	Haryana
Indonesia	Nadia Purwoko	26	Bengkulu
Jamaica	Kadejah Anderson	22	Kingston
Japan	Haruka Oda	24	Saitama
Kazakhstan	Aim Isengalieva	23	Astrakhan
Kosovo	Songyl Meniqi	22	Pristina
Laos	Nobphalat Sikaiphak	21	Vientiane
Lebanon	Anastasia Abou Mitri	27	Beirut
Macau	Débora de Oliveira	22	Macau
Malaysia	Debra Jeanne Poh	22	Penang
Mexico	Lezly Díaz	23	Jalisco
Moldova	Alexandra Predus	27	Bucharest
Mongolia	Burte-Ujin Anu	20	Ulaanbaatar
Myanmar	Sumyat Phoo	23	Naypyidaw
Nepal	Urussa Joshi	26	Kathmandu
Netherlands	Kimberley Xhofleer	24	Limburg
New Zealand	Hayley Robinson	26	Auckland
Norway	Maria Barbantonis	27	Oslo
Panama	Gabriela Mornhinweg	22	Panama City
Paraguay	Clara Sosa	24	Asuncion
Peru	Andrea Moberg	25	Loreto
Philippines	Eva Patalinjug	24	Cebu
Poland	Malwina Ratajczak	19	Szczecin
Portugal	Priscila Alves	23	Setubal
Puerto Rico	Nicole Colón	25	San Juan
Russia	Talia Aibedullina	22	Ulyanovsk
Scotland	Olivia McPike	20	Edinburgh
Sierra Leone	Fanta Kabia	21	Freetown
South Africa	Misha Christie van Blommestein	26	Pretoria
South Korea	Min Choi	26	Seoul
Spain	Patricia López	19	Murcia
Sri Lanka	Pawani Vithanage	23	Colombo
Suriname	Safina Barsatie	25	Paramaribo
Sweden	Hanna Louise Haag	22	Gefle
Taiwan	Tania Tan Yi Rong	26	Taipei
Tanzania	Queen Mugesi Ainory Gesase	18	Dodoma
Tatarstan	Zulfiya Sharafeeva	24	Kazan
Thailand	Namoey Chanaphan	25	Chaiyaphum
Ukraine	Yana Laurinaichute	26	Kyiv
United States	Paola Cossyleon	24	Chicago
United States Virgin Islands	Morgan Evans	27	Saint Croix
Venezuela	Biliannis Alvarez	20	Falcon
Vietnam	Bùi Phương Nga	20	Ha Tinh
Wales	Lauren Parkinson	23	Cardiff
Zambia	Isabel Chikoti	27	Chingola
