= Miss Grand International 2027 =

15th Miss Grand International beauty pageant

- Date: October 2027
- Venue: MGI Hall, Bangkok, Thailand
- Broadcaster: YouTube

Miss Grand International 2027 will be the 15th Miss Grand International pageant, scheduled to be held at the MGI Hall in Bangkok, Thailand, in October 2027.

Jihan Dimack of Tanzania will crown her successor at the end of the event.

== Background ==
=== Location and date ===
In June 2024, the Miss Grand International organization announced that Vietnam would host the 15th edition of the pageant, a statement confirmed by the Miss Grand Vietnam organization that same month.

However, on 29 September 2026, while the 14th edition of the pageant was still under way, the Miss Grand International organization announced a change in the host country to Thailand, which will now host the special 15th anniversary edition of the franchise.

== Contestants ==
The confirmed contestants are as follows:

Country/Territory	Contestant	Age (Note: Ages at the time of the pageant)	Hometown	Ref.
Nigeria	Grace Ekrakene	24	Sapele	

== Upcoming national pageants ==
Country/Territory	Date
Czech Republic	8 May 2027
Ecuador	2027
Haiti	2027
Honduras	2027
Japan	2027
Paraguay	2027
Spain	2027
