= Miss Grand International 2016 =

4th Miss Grand International competition, beauty pageant edition

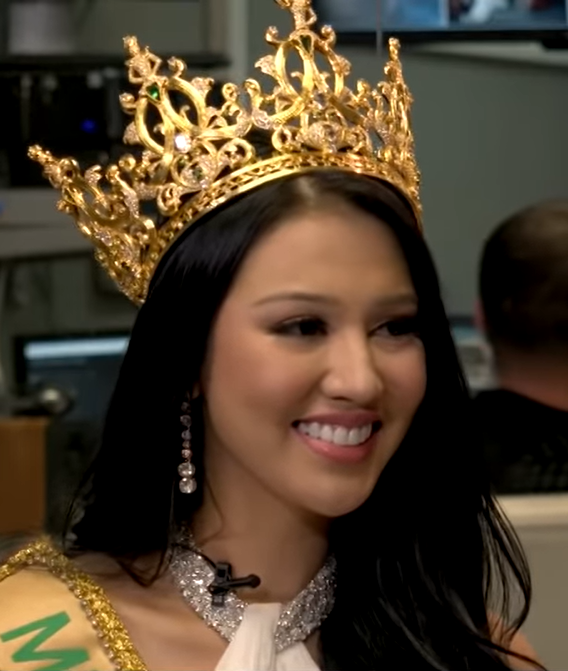
- Ariska Putri Pertiwi
- Date: October 25, 2016
- Presenters: Brian J. White
- Venue: Westgate International Theater, Las Vegas, Nevada, United States
- Broadcaster: YouTube; Facebook Live
- Entrants: 74
- Placements: 21
- Debuts: Aruba; Bahamas; Iraq; Jamaica; Lithuania; Rwanda; Turkey; Uruguay
- Withdrawals: Albania; Angola; Belarus; Bulgaria; Cambodia; Ghana; Guyana; Haiti; Honduras; Iran; Israel; Kenya; Macedonia; Mongolia; Namibia; Nepal; Sweden; Tonga; Tunisia; Uganda; United States Virgin Islands
- Returns: Ecuador; Latvia; Luxembourg; Mauritius; New Zealand; Nicaragua; Paraguay; Russia; Switzerland; Tahiti
- Winner: Ariska Putri Pertiwi; Indonesia
- Best National Costume: Ariska Putri Pertiwi; Indonesia
- Best in Swimsuit: Selvinique Wright; Bahamas
- Best Evening gown: Cherelle Rose Patterson; England

External videos
- Grand final competition

Miss Grand International 2016 was the fourth Miss Grand International pageant, held at the Westgate International Theater in Las Vegas, Nevada, United States, on October 25, 2016 the first time the contest was held outside Thailand. Candidates from seventy-four countries and territories competed for the title. At the end of the event Claire Elizabeth Parker, Miss Grand International 2015 of Australia crowned Ariska Putri Pertiwi of Indonesia as her successor, making her the first Asian candidate to win the title. Meanwhile, the first to fourth vice-miss titles was awarded to the representatives of the Philippines, Thailand, Puerto Rico, and the United States, respectively.

The pageant's grand final was hosted by an American television personality, Brian J. White, and was broadcast to audiences worldwide via the pageant YouTube channel and the official Facebook page.

== Background ==
=== Date and venue ===
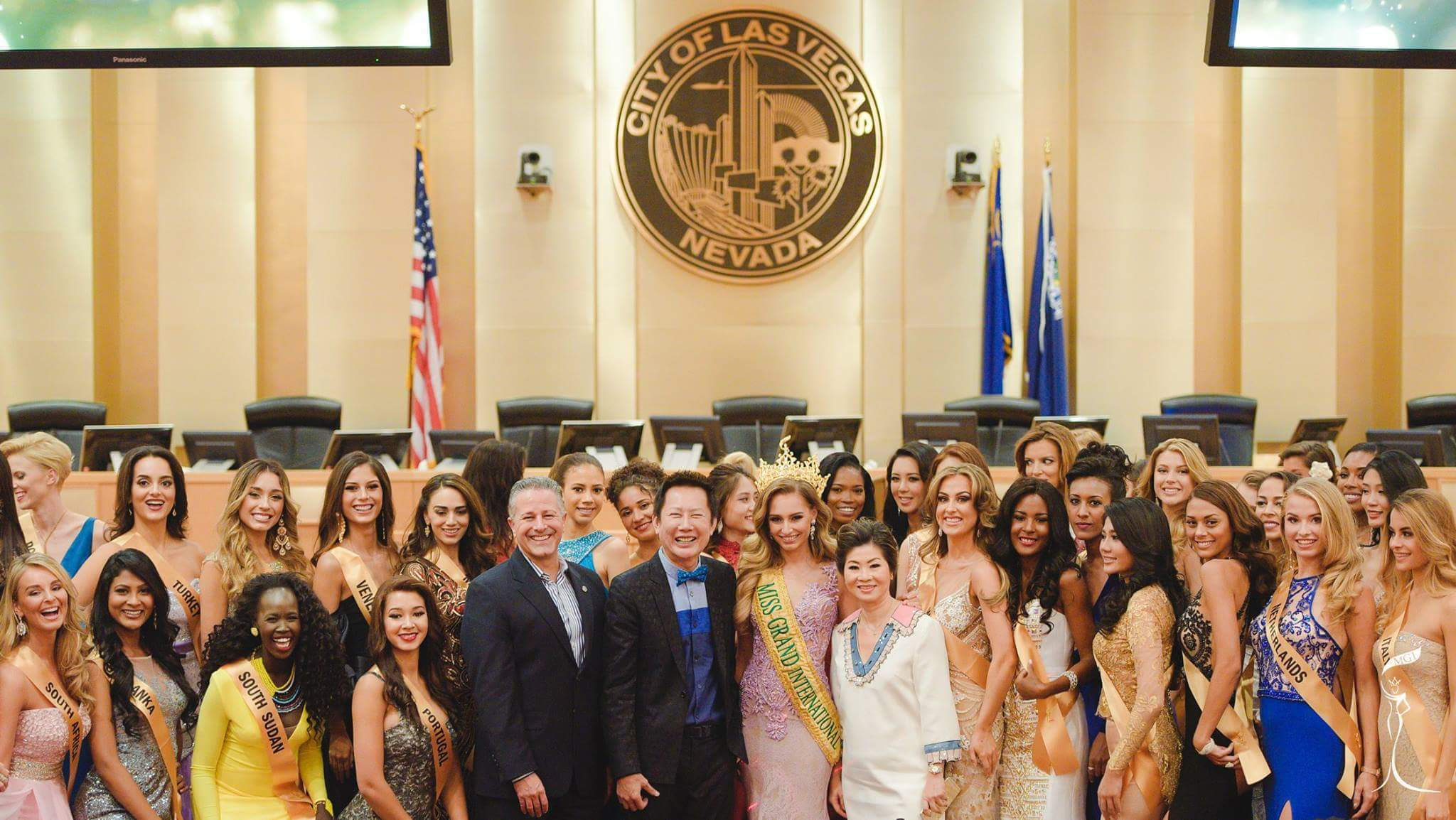
Miss Grand International 2016 contestant and Nawat Itsaragrisil President of the organization Miss Grand International in the press conference of the contest at City Hall in Las Vegas, Nevada.

At Miss Grand International 2016, contestants from each country are scheduled to arrive at McCarran International Airport in Las Vegas, Nevada. between October 8–9, 2016. The contest organized a shuttle service from the airport to the hotel, Westgate. Las Vegas Resort and Casino Las Vegas by the contestant registration process. Including a sash handing event for representatives of each country has been held in this hotel as well. Then, on October 10, 2016, a press conference for the contest was held at City Hall in Las Vegas, Nevada. Each entrant will have the opportunity to introduce themselves and give a brief statement about the contest or other issues in front of all press conference participants.

After that, on October 11–13, 2016, all contestants visited other attractions and landmarks within the city and nearby areas such as Grand Canyon, Red Rock Canyon National Conservation Area and Hoover Dam Then on October 14, 2016, the Swimsuit Competition was held at the hotel's swimming pool. The winners of this best swimwear contest were announced in the final round. and the next day All of the contestants attended the William Carr's Photography charity red carpet fashion event to raise funds for Veterans in the United States.

On October 16, 2016 the Best National Costume Contest was held at the Fremont Street Experience in downtown Las Vegas. The contestant who receives the most votes from Facebook users around the world will receive the best national costume award. The winner was announced in the final contest on October 25, 2016.

=== Selection of participants ===
Of all seventy-four participating candidates, only eleven were determined through the Miss Grand national pageant, including the representatives of Australia, the Dominican Republic, Japan, Myanmar, Netherlands, Nigeria, South Africa, Spain, Sri Lanka, Thailand, and United States, while the candidates from Albania, Cambodia, Kosovo, Namibia, and Nepal who were also named the country representatives for this year edition on the Miss Grand national stages, did not enter the international tournament for different reasons, such as Heng Chantha of Cambodia and Zeenus Lama of Nepal who unabled to compete due to visa issues.

Initially, eighty-seven candidates confirmed their participants but only seventy-six of them literally entered the pageant, while the remaining withdrew. However, two of the entered candidates, Arna Ýr Jónsdóttir of Iceland and Victoria Ericsson of Sweden, later withdrew during the pageant camp due to a conflict with the organizer and health problems, respectively.

== Results ==
=== Placements ===
| Placement | Contestant |
|---|---|
| Miss Grand International 2016 | Indonesia – Ariska Putri Pertiwi |
| 1st Runner-Up | Philippines – Nicole Cordoves |
| 2nd Runner-Up | Thailand – Supaporn Malisorn |
| 3rd Runner-Up | Puerto Rico – Madison Anderson |
| 4th Runner-Up | United States – Michelle León |
| Top 10 | Bahamas – Selvinique Wright; Macau – Hio Man Chan; Peru – Prissila Howard; South Korea – Cho Ye-Seul §; Ukraine – Veronika Mykhailyshyn |
| Top 20 | Australia – Dani Fitch; Cuba – Merys Navarro; Jamaica – Dianne Brown; Malaysia – Ranmeet Jassal; Mexico – Paulina Flores Cantú; Portugal – Ana Bomfim; Spain – Adriana Sánchez; Tahiti – Vaiata Buisson; Venezuela – Débora Medina; Vietnam – Nguyễn Thị Loan; Wales – Rachael Tate |

§ – Voted into the Top 10 by viewers and awarded as Miss Popular Vote

=== Special awards ===
| Awards | Contestant |
|---|---|
| Best National Costume | Indonesia – Ariska Putri Pertiwi |
| Best Evening Gown | England – Cherelle Rose |
| Best in Swimsuit | Bahamas – Selvinique Wright |
| Best in Social Media | Jamaica – Dianne Brown |
| Miss Popular Vote | South Korea – Cho Ye-Seul |

=== Best National Costume ===
Best national costume contest was held on 16 October 2016.

| Final results | Country |
|---|---|
| Best National Costume | Indonesia – Ariska Putri Pertiwi |
| Top 10 | Bahamas – Selvinique Wright; Ecuador – Carmen Iglesias; India – Pankhuri Gidwani; Malaysia – Ranmeet Jassal; Paraguay – Cindy Nordmann; Peru – Prissila Howard; Philippines – Nicole Cordoves; Thailand – Supaporn Malisorn; Vietnam – Nguyễn Thị Loan |

== Contestants ==
74 contestants competed for the title.

| Country/Territory | Contestant | Age | Hometown |
|---|---|---|---|
| Aruba | Chimay Ramos | 23 | Willemstad |
| Australia | Dani Fitch | 27 | Sydney |
| (The Bahamas) Bahamas | Selvinique Wright | 24 | Nassau |
| Belgium | Kawtar Riahi Idrissi | 21 | Gembloux |
| Bolivia | Mory Joselyn Toro | 22 | Copacabana |
| Brazil | Renata Sena | 21 | Cuiabá |
| Canada | Monica Horvat | 26 | Calgary |
| China | Siru He | 19 | Huizhou |
| Colombia | Juliana Margarita Flórez | 24 | Popayán |
| Costa Rica | Monique Rodríguez | 27 | San José |
| Cuba | Merys Navarro | 24 | Puerto Padre |
| Czech Republic | Monika Vaculíková | 25 | Bruntál |
| Denmark | Ida Sjöström | 17 | Copenhagen |
| Dominican Republic | Lucero Arias | 19 | Jarabacoa |
| Ecuador | Carmen Iglesias | 22 | Guayaquil |
| Egypt | Mireille Azer | 22 | Port Fouad |
| England | Cherelle Rose Patterson | 26 | Sutton-in-Ashfield |
| Estonia | Merylin Nau | 22 | Tallinn |
| Ethiopia | Genet Tsegay | 25 | Addis Ababa |
| France | Océane Pernodet | 21 | Remiremont |
| Guatemala | Susan Larios Cruz | 24 | Jalapa |
| Hong Kong | Rebecca Lau Hoi-Yee | 25 | Hong Kong City |
| Hungary | Anna Varadi | 24 | Budapest |
| India | Pankhuri Gidwani | 19 | Lucknow |
| Indonesia | Ariska Putri Pertiwi | 22 | Medan |
| Iraq | Klaodia Khalaf | 21 | Baghdad |
| Italy | Martina Corrias | 18 | Naples |
| Jamaica | Dianne Brown | 25 | Kingston |
| Japan | Ayaka Sato | 27 | Aichi |
| Latvia | Meldra Rozenberga | 20 | Riga |
| Lithuania | Aista Maciulyte | 17 | Klaipėda |
| Luxembourg | Natascha Bintz | 26 | Luxembourg City |
| Macau | Hio Man Chan | 21 | Macau City |
| Malaysia | Ranmeet Jassal | 24 | Selangor |
| Malta | Christine Mifsud | 25 | Iż-Żejtun |
| Mauritius | Bibi Kasar Sehba Ramjaun | 22 | Port Louis |
| Mexico | Paulina Flores Cantú | 25 | Monterrey |
| Moldova | Alina Staicu | 27 | Chișinău |
| Myanmar | Nandar Lwin | 23 | Yangon |
| Netherlands | Floor Masselink | 21 | Groningen |
| New Zealand | Margaret Brown | 22 | Auckland |
| Nicaragua | Michelle Lacayo | 27 | Diriamba |
| Nigeria | Rachel Ikekhuame | 25 | Umuahia |
| Norway | Yasmin Osee Aakre | 27 | Stavanger |
| Panama | Selena Santamaría | 19 | Colón |
| Paraguay | Cindy Nordmann | 20 | Encarnación |
| Peru | Prissila Howard | 25 | Piura |
| Philippines | Nicole Cordoves | 24 | Makati |
| Poland | Marta Redo | 24 | Czarna Białostocka |
| Portugal | Ana Bomfim | 25 | Bragança |
| Puerto Rico | Madison Anderson | 20 | Phoenix |
| Romania | Ioana Mihalache | 25 | Constanţa |
| Russia | Daria Zatsepina | 22 | Stavropol |
| Rwanda | Sonia Gisa | 25 | Kigali |
| Scotland | Gemma Palmer | 21 | Aberfoyle |
| Singapore | Sabrina Ng | 20 | Singapore City |
| Slovakia | Viktória Nagyová | 20 | Bratislava |
| South Africa | Caitlin Harty | 21 | Polokwane |
| South Korea | Cho Ye-Seul | 24 | Seoul |
| South Sudan | Teresa Yuol | 22 | Juba |
| Spain | Adriana Sánchez | 25 | Málaga |
| Sri Lanka | Buddhika Ruman | 24 | Tirunelveli |
| Suriname | Daryola Brandon | 21 | Paramaribo |
| Switzerland | Ambre Chavailla | 18 | Zürich |
| (French Polynesia) Tahiti | Vaiata Buisson | 22 | Papeete |
| Taiwan | Ri-Xing Zhu | 26 | Taipei |
| Thailand | Supaporn Malisorn | 22 | Prachinburi |
| Turkey | Diana Osypenko | 27 | Korkuteli |
| Ukraine | Veronika Mykhailyshyn | 20 | Odesa |
| United States | Michelle León | 19 | Newburgh |
| Uruguay | Melina Carballo | 20 | Montevideo |
| Venezuela | Débora Medina | 22 | San Cristóbal |
| Vietnam | Nguyễn Thị Loan | 26 | Thái Bình |
| Wales | Rachael Tate | 27 | Cardiff |
