= Miss Grand Sweden =

Beauty pageant in Sweden

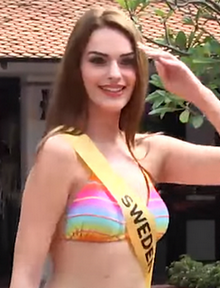
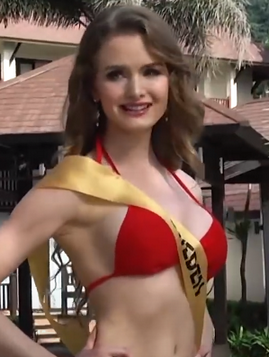
- Pamela Olivera; Miss Grand Sweden 2014 Issabella Georgsson; Miss Grand Sweden 2015
- Formation: 2013
- Type: Beauty pageant
- Headquarters: Stockholm
- Location: Sweden
- Members: Miss Grand International
- Official language: Swedish
- National director: Peter Hadward
- General director: Kersten Liba
- Parent organization: Miss Universe Sweden (2013 – 2014); Miss Queen of Scandinavia (2014 – 2021)
- Website: MissQueenOfScandinavia.com

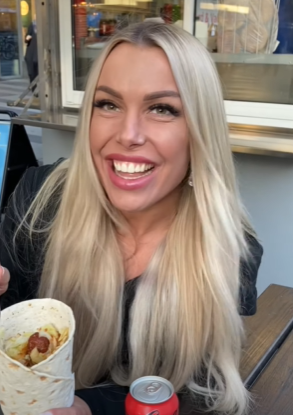
Jennie Frondell Miss Grand Sweden 2021

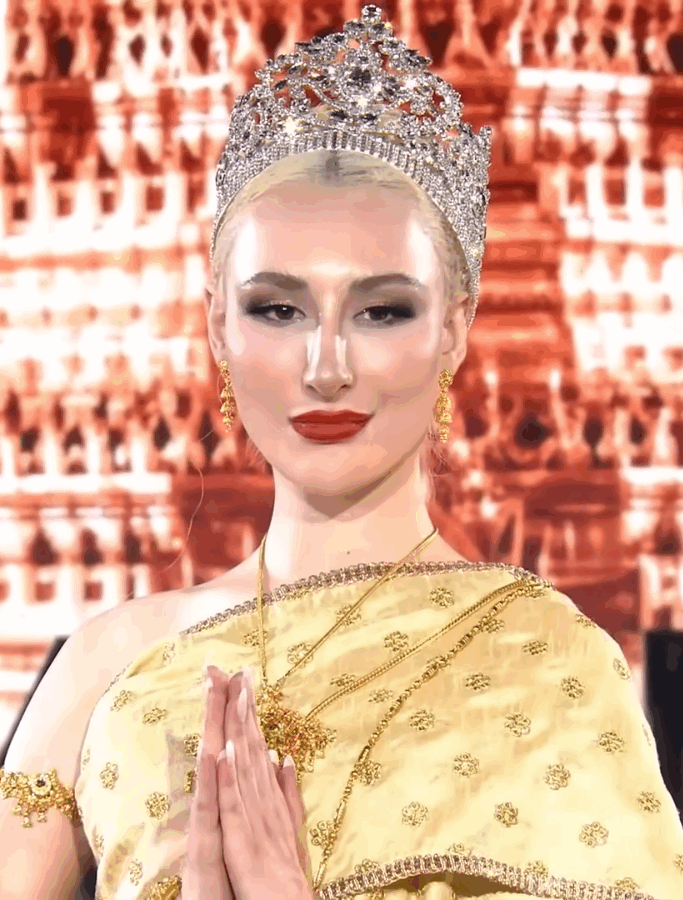
Alexandra Timmros Miss Grand Sweden 2025

Miss Grand Sweden is a national beauty pageant title awarded to Swedish representatives competing at the Miss Grand International pageant. The title was first awarded in 2013, when a finalist in Miss Universe Sweden 2012, Claudia Sundberg, was assigned to partake in the inaugural edition of the parent international tournament in Thailand. In 2014, the license was transferred to the Miss Queen of Scandinavia Organization (MQOS), the Miss World Sweden organizer chaired by Peter Hadward, who served as the Miss Grand Sweden director until 2021.

In the early years under the direction of MQOS, Swedish representatives for Miss Grand International were elected through the Miss World Sweden pageant; however, from 2018 to 2021, all representatives were instead handpicked.

== History ==
Since the establishment of the Miss Grand International in 2013, Sweden has always sent its representatives to compete; the first Swedish candidate at the mentioned tournament was Claudia Sundberg, who was appointed to the title of Miss Grand Sweden after obtaining the fifth position at the Miss Universe Sweden 2013 pageant. Sundberg then represented the country at the Miss Grand International 2013 in Thailand, but she withdrew from the contest before its final round.

Later in 2014, the titleholder was directly determined through the Miss Universe Sweden pageant; however, the license was instead transferred to another organizer, Miss Queen of Scandinavia, which also served as the licensee of the Miss World Sweden pageant. Since then one of the Miss World Sweden runners-up were assumed to be Miss Grand Sweden until the contract was terminated in 2022.

Since the first competition in 2013, the highest and only placement of Swedish representatives at Miss Grand International is the top 20 finalists, obtained in 2018 by Hanna-Louise Haag Tuvér.

== International competition ==
The following is a list of Swedish representatives at the Miss Grand International contest.

Year	Representative	Original national title	International result	
Year	Representative	Original national title	Placement	Other awards
2013	Claudia Sundberg	Miss Universe Sweden 2012 Finalist	Withdrew during the competition	
2014	Eleonore Lilja	Miss Grand Sweden 2014	Unable to compete	
2014	Pamela Olivera	Miss World Sweden 2013 Finalist	Unplaced	—N/a
2015	Issabella Georgsson	2nd runner-up Miss World Sweden 2015	Unplaced	—N/a
2016	Viktoria Eriksson	1st runner-up Miss World Sweden 2016	Withdrew during the competition	
2017	Maja Westlin	1st runner-up Miss World Sweden 2017	Unplaced	—N/a
2018	Hanna-Louise Haag Tuvér	Miss World Sweden 2017	Top 20	—N/a
2019	Clara Wahlqvist	Miss Universe Sweden 2018 Finalist	Unplaced	—N/a
2020	Felicia Brunzell	—N/a	Unplaced	—N/a
2021	Jennie Frondell	—N/a	Unplaced	—N/a
No representatives from 2022 to 2024
2025	Alexandra Timmros	Miss Universe Sweden 2021 Finalist	Unplaced	—N/a
Color keys for the Placements at Miss Grand International Declared as the winner Ended as a runner-up (Top 5) Ended as a finalist (Top 10) Ended as a semifinalist (Top 20/21)
