= Miss Grand International 2013 =

1st Miss Grand International Competition, beauty pageant edition

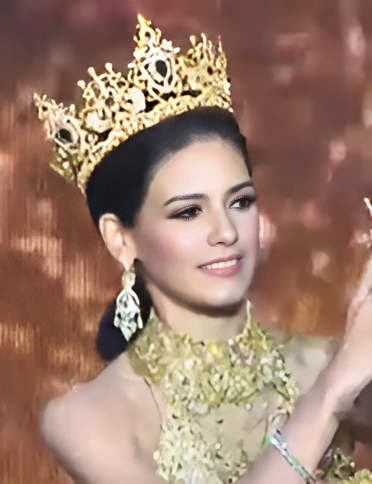
- Janelee Chaparro
- Date: 19 November 2013
- Presenters: Utt Panichkul; Sonia Couling
- Entertainment: Thaitanium
- Venue: IMPACT Arena, Muang Thong Thani, Nonthaburi, Thailand
- Broadcaster: Facebook live; Channel 7
- Entrants: 71
- Placements: 20
- Debuts: Algeria; Argentina; Australia; Belgium; Bolivia; Brazil; Canada; China; Colombia; Cuba; Czech Republic; Dominican Republic; Ecuador; Egypt; El Salvador; England; Estonia; Ethiopia; Finland; France; Georgia; Germany; Greece; Guadeloupe; Guatemala; Guinea; Honduras; Hungary; India; Indonesia; Italy; Japan; Kazakhstan; Kenya; Kosovo; Latvia; Lebanon; Macau; Macedonia; Malaysia; Mexico; Moldova; Mongolia; Myanmar; Namibia; Nepal; Netherlands; New Zealand; Norway; Pakistan; Paraguay; Philippines; Poland; Portugal; Puerto Rico; Romania; Russia; Serbia; Slovakia; Spain; Sri Lanka; Switzerland; South Korea; Thailand; Turkmenistan; Uganda; Venezuela; Vietnam; Wales; United States; Zimbabwe
- Winner: Janelee Chaparro; Puerto Rico
- Best National Costume: Jie Pan; China

Miss Grand International 2013 was the 1st edition Miss Grand International pageant, held at the Impact Arena in Muang Thong Thani, Nonthaburi, Thailand, on 19 November 2013.

At the end of the event, Janelee Chaparro of Puerto Rico was crowned Miss Grand International 2013. She received a cash prize of US$30,000.

== Background ==
=== Date and venue ===
After Nawat Itsaragrisil ended his role as a producer of the beauty pageant Miss Thailand World for BEC-Tero of Channel 3 in 2012, he established his own pageant, launching Miss Grand Thailand in 2013 in partnership with Channel 3's rival, Channel 7, as well as the international platform Miss Grand International, whose first edition's press release was arranged on 22 October 2013, at the Pathumwan Princess Hotel, Bangkok. In such an event, the pageant schedule was revealed. The pageant camp was set to happen from 3–19 November in three different cities, including Chiang Mai, Pattaya, and Bangkok.

The pageant consisted of four main sub-events, including the national costume contest held at the Promenada Resort Mall, Chiang Mai, on 8 November; the swimsuit competition held on 13 October at the Zign Hotel, Pattaya; and the preliminary and final rounds held in Bangkok on 17 and 19 October at the IMPACT Arena, Nonthaburi.

=== Selection of participants ===
Since it was the first edition of the pageant, most of its contestants were appointed to compete; some of them were runners-up of other national pageants. Only three countries organized the national pageants individually to select their representatives for Miss Grand, including Malaysia, Thailand, and Zimbabwe. However, the Zimbabwe winner was later replaced by an appointed representative due to the national team's internal conflicts.

== Results ==
=== Placements ===
Placement	Contestant
Miss Grand International 2013	Puerto Rico – Janelee Chaparro
1st runner-up	Dominican Republic – Chantel Martínez
2nd runner-up	Slovakia – Denisa Pasečiaková
3rd runner-up	Philippines – Annalie Forbes
4th runner-up	Australia – Kelly Maguire
Top 10	Brazil – Tamara de Costa Bicca; Cuba – Jamillette Gaxiola; Latvia – Kristīne Rancāne; Sri Lanka – Dannielle Kerkoven; Venezuela – Mariana Jiménez
Top 20	China – Jie Pan; Colombia – Carolina Betancourth; Ecuador – Alexandra Castillo; Macedonia – Sandra Stefanovska; Myanmar – Htar Htet Htet; Netherlands – Talisa Wolters; Pakistan – Shanzay Hayat; Thailand – Yada Theppanom; United States – Blair Griffith; Zimbabwe – Samantha Thsuma

=== Special awards ===
Award	Contestant
Best National Costume	China – Jie Pan
Best Evening Gown	Dominican Republic – Chantel Martínez
Best in Swimsuit	Latvia – Kristīne Rancāne
Miss Popular Vote	Myanmar – Htar Htet Htet

== Pageant ==
=== Format ===
In the pageant grand final round held on 19 November, after an introduction section, twenty contestants, who were selected through the preliminary round held on 17 October as well as all pre-pageant scorings, qualified for the top 20, in which each of the qualified candidates competed in the swimsuit. The score from this round, together with all previous accumulation scores, determined the top 10 finalists who then competed against each other in the evening gown and speech session. Based on accumulation scores, the final five were selected to continue in the question and answer portion, where the winner and runners-up were determined.

== Contestants ==
71 contestants competed for the title.

Country/Territory	Delegate	Age	Hometown
Algeria	Ines Belkacem	21	Algiers
Argentina	Susel Jacquet	24	Corrientes
Australia	Kelly Maguire	26	Sydney
Belgium	Karolien Termonia	26	Limburg
Bolivia	Mariana García	24	La Paz
Brazil	Tamara de Costa Bicca	22	Porto Alegre
Canada	Natalie Carriere	21	Iroquois Falls
China	Jie Pan	20	Beijing
Colombia	Carolina Betancourth	25	Cali
Cuba	Jamillette Gaxiola	23	Havana
Czech Republic	Markéta Brizová	23	Ostrava
Dominican Republic	Chantel Martínez	19	New York
Ecuador	Alexandra Castillo	22	San Lorenzo
Egypt	Aya Abdallah Ahmed	23	Alexandria
El Salvador	Elisa Durán	24	San Salvador
England	Julie Montague	23	Liverpool
Estonia	Evgeniia Forkashi	19	Tallinn
Ethiopia	Helen Getachew	23	Addis Ababa
Finland	Katariina Suuniitty	22	Sastamala
France	Margaux Serenoff	22	Paris
Georgia	Anna Lomidzee	18	Tbilisi
Germany	Diana König	26	Ilmenau
Greece	Anastasia Papatsori	23	Atenas
Guadeloupe	Orphélie Morti	21	Basse-Terre
Guatemala	Michelle Cohn	18	Guatemala City
Guinea	Jasmine Sidibé	23	Conakry
Honduras	Nelly Reyes	21	La Ceiba
Hungary	Eszter Tüzes	20	Budapest
India	Rupa Khurana	23	New Delhi
Indonesia	Novia Mamuaja	19	Manado
Italy	Katarina Chabrecekova	22	Rome
Japan	Eriko Yoshii	23	Akita
Kazakhstan	Yuliya Kolesnik	19	Almaty
Kenya	Pauline Akwacha	22	Nairobi
Kosovo	Lirie Sejdija	17	Pristina
Latvia	Kristīne Rancāne	24	Rēzekne
Lebanon	Elizabeth Ojeil	22	Beirut
Macau	Tiffany Wong	24	Macau
Macedonia	Sandra Stefanovska	21	Skopje
Malaysia	Michelle Moey	22	Kuala Lumpur
Mexico	Laura Elisa Álvarez	23	Mérida
Moldova	Alyona Chitoroaga	25	Chișinău
Mongolia	Delgermaa Enkhtsogt	20	Ulaanbaatar
Myanmar	Htar Htet Htet	24	Kalay
Namibia	Grace Khakhane	23	Windhoek
Nepal	Ashmita Sitoula	21	Jhapa
Netherlands	Talisa Wolters	22	Born
New Zealand	Rachel Crofts	25	Manawatū District
Norway	Christine Frestad	22	Flekkefjord
Pakistan	Shanzay Hayat	24	Islamabad
Paraguay	Sendy Cáceres	24	Encarnación
Philippines	Annalie Forbes	20	Malolos
Poland	Anna Moniuszko	20	Białystok
Portugal	Gilda Marisela Silva	18	Madeira
Puerto Rico	Janelee Chaparro	22	Barceloneta
Romania	Iuliana Vasile	23	Bucharest
Russia	Anyuta Volkova	21	Moscow
Serbia	Milica Stojsavljević	21	Belgrade
Slovakia	Denisa Pasečiaková	24	Bratislava
South Korea	Yu-ru Kim	21	Seoul
Spain	Jenifer Guedes	24	Agüimes
Sri Lanka	Dannielle Kerkoven	26	Colombo
Switzerland	Cynthia Montchong	17	Belina
Thailand	Yada Theppanom	21	Prachuap Khiri Khan
Turkmenistan	Natalia Vasileva	23	Ashgabat
Uganda	Pierra Akwero	26	Entebbe
United States	Blair Griffith	25	Denver
Venezuela	Mariana Jiménez	19	La Guaira
Vietnam	Khánh Bích Nguyễn	21	Hanoi
Wales	Sophie Hall	22	Cardiff
Zimbabwe	Samantha Thsuma	23	Bulawayo
