= Miss Grand Egypt =

Beauty pageant in Egypt

- Formation: 2013
- Headquarters: Cairo
- Location: Egypt
- Official language: Arabic; English
- National director: Manar El Saaidy (2026 – present); Amal Rezk (2013 – 2021, 2023 – Present)
- Parent organization: Queen of Egypt (2026 – present); Miss Egypt (2013 – 2021, 2023 – Present)
- Affiliations: Miss Grand International

Miss Grand Egypt is a national beauty pageant organisation that selects representatives to compete at Miss Grand International. In 2013, Aya Abdallah Ahmed from Cairo was the first representative appointed by the Miss Grand Egypt licensee, Amal Rezk. She represented Egypt at the inaugural Miss Grand International pageant in Thailand. Rezk is also the director of Miss Egypt, and Miss Eco International.

Since the first competition in 2013, there has never been an Egyptian contestant that been placed at Miss Grand International.

== History ==
Egypt joined Miss Grand International in 2013 and was represented by Aya Abdallah Ahmed, who was at the contest. From 2013 to 2021, the right to send Egyptian candidates to compete at Miss Grand International belonged to the director of Miss Egypt, Amal Rezk. Representatives were either chosen or selected by a contest.

At Miss Egypt 2021, the winner was expected to compete at Miss Grand International 2022 in Indonesia, but due to the termination of the partnership between Miss Grand International (MGI PLC) and Miss Egypt, none was selected.

== Egyptian representatives at Miss Grand International ==
Year	Governorate	Miss Grand Egypt	Title	Placement	Special Awards	National Director
2026	Cairo	Menna El Batran	Appointed	TBA		Manar El Saaidy
2025	Cairo	Manar El Saaidy	Miss Grand Egypt 2025	None		Amaal Rezk
2024	Cairo	Zeina Emara	Miss Grand Egypt 2024	None		Amaal Rezk
2023	Cairo	Mariam Khatab	1st runner-up Miss Egypt 2023	None		Amaal Rezk
2022	Did not compete					
2021	Cairo	Shahenaz Alaa Dabous	Miss Grand Egypt 2021	None		Amaal Rezk
2020	Cairo	Virginia Hany Abdallah	Miss Grand Egypt 2020	None		Amaal Rezk
2019	Cairo	Esraa Abdel-Mohsen	Miss Egypt All Nations 2019	None		Amaal Rezk
2018	Did not compete					
2017	Cairo	Merna Ayman Hosny	2nd runner-up Miss World Egypt 2017	None		Amaal Rezk
2016	Port Said	Mireille Mikhail Azer	Miss Grand Egypt 2016	None		Amaal Rezk
2015	Cairo	Cherine Shiba	Appointed	None		Amaal Rezk
2014	Cairo	Nada Zakaria	Appointed	Did not compete		Amaal Rezk
2013	Alexandria	Aya Abdallah Ahmed	Appointed	None		Amaal Rezk

== Winners gallery ==
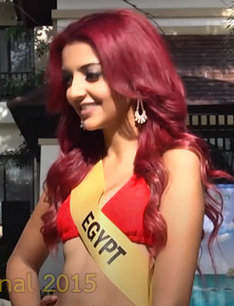
2015, Cherine Shiba

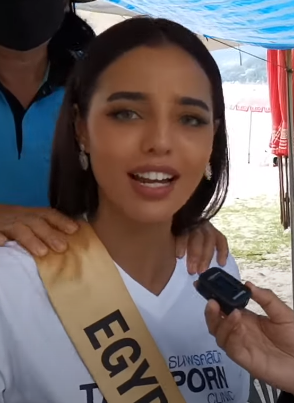
2021, Shahenaz Dabous

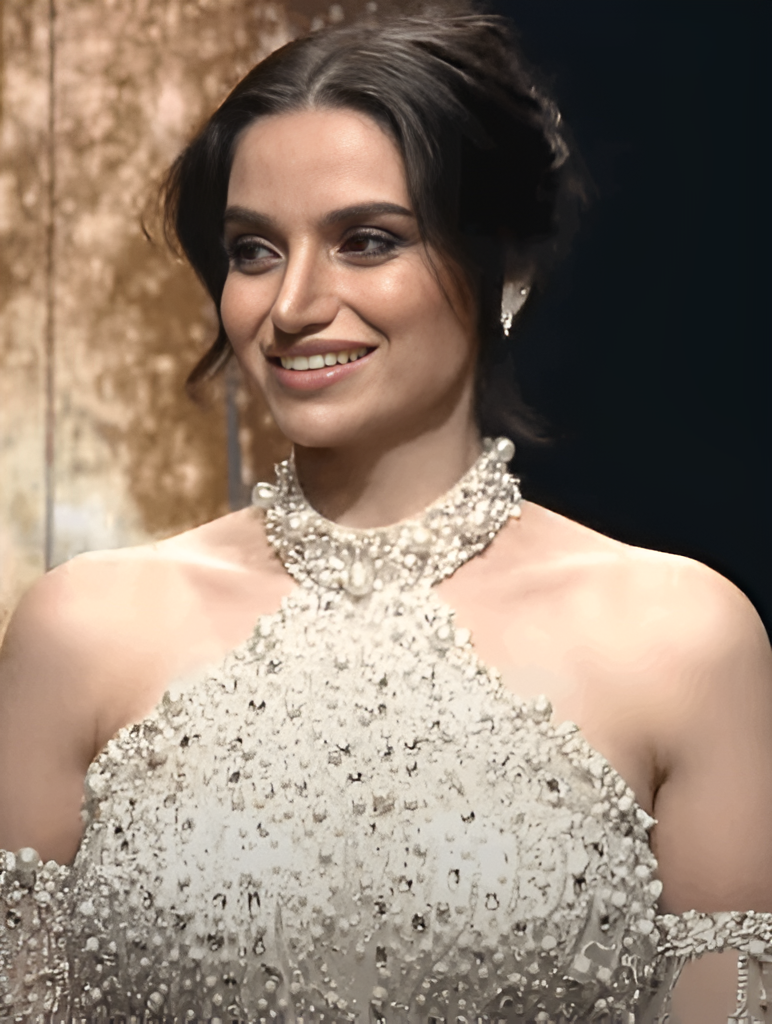
2024, Zeina Emara

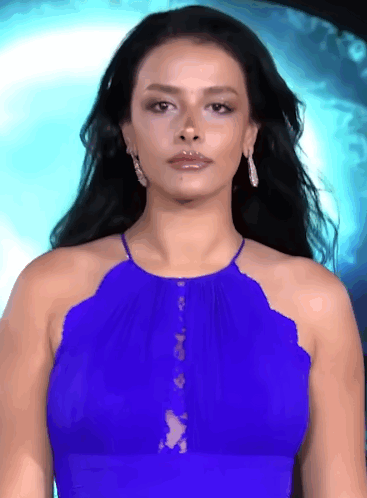
2025, Manar El Saaidy
