= Miss Grand Kazakhstan =

Kazakh beauty pageant title

- Formation: 2013
- Type: Beauty pageant
- Location: Kazakhstan
- Members: Miss Grand International
- Official language: Kazakh; Russian
- National director: Alena Rivlina-Kyrbasova (2025)
- Parent organization: Idol Fashion Management LLC (2013–2015); Volga Models (2018); Miss Qazaqstan (2025)

Miss Grand Kazakhstan is a female beauty pageant title awarded to Kazakh representatives competing at the Miss Grand International pageant. The title was first mentioned in 2013 when an Almaty-based model, Yuliya Kolesnik, was assigned by Idol Fashion Management LLC to represent Kazakhstan at the first edition of Miss Grand International in Thailand; however, she was unplaced.

Since the establishment of Miss Grand International in 2013, Kazakhstan has occasionally sent candidates to compete. Its representatives were sent by different licensees each year, and most of them received non-placements at the grand final stage, except for the 2018 candidate, Aim Isengalieva, who was named one of the final 20.

== History ==
From 2013 to 2014, the license for Miss Grand Kazakhstan belonged to Idol Fashion Management LLC, a Bishkek-based event organizer company headed by a Kyrgyz businessperson, Usen Berdibaev (Kyrgyz: Бердибаев Асан). The Kazakh representatives for these two editions were directly appointed by the mentioned licensee. In 2015, an attempt to organize the first contest of Miss Grand Kazakhstan was observed, but the project was later canceled for undisclosed reasons, resulting in no Kazakh candidate in Miss Grand International 2015.

In 2018, after the franchise of Miss Grand Kazakhstan was vacant from 2015 to 2017, it was then purchased by Volga Models, a Russia-based model agency and the organizer of Miss Tourism Russia chaired by Vladimir Ilyin, who assigned one of the Miss Tourism Russia 2016 finalists, who is an ethnic Kazakh from Astrakhan, Aim Isengalieva, as Miss Grand Kazakhstan 2018. She then competed internationally in Myanmar, where she was placed among the top 20 finalists, making her the first and only Kazakh candidate, as of 2023, to be placed at Miss Grand International.

Gallery

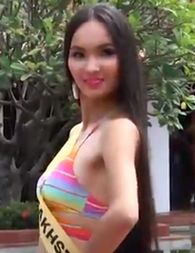
Aidana Elemesova
Miss Grand Kazakhstan 2014

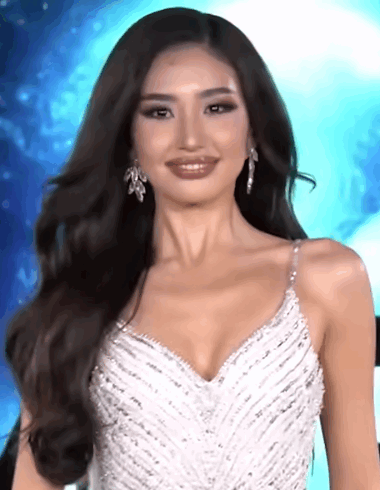
Tomiris Kadyrkhan
Miss Grand Kazakhstan 2025

== International competition ==
The following is a list of Kazakh representatives at the Miss Grand International contest.

Color keys

- : Declared as the winner
- : Ended as a runner-up (Top 5)
- : Ended as a finalist (Top 10)
- : Ended as a semifinalist (Top 20/21)
- : Ended as special awards winner

Year	Miss Grand Kazakhstan		Title	Placement	Special Awards	National Director
Year	Ramanized name	Kazakh name	Title	Placement	Special Awards	National Director
2026	Anel Yemel	Анель Емел	Miss Grand International Qazaqstan 2026 (Note: Supplemental title at the Miss Qazaqstan 2025 pageant.)			Alena Rivlina-Kyrbasova
2025	Tomiris Kadyrkhan	Томирис Кадырхан	Miss Earth Qazaqstan 2025 (Note: Supplemental title at the Miss Qazaqstan 2024 pageant.)	Unplaced		Alena Rivlina-Kyrbasova
Did not compete between 2023–2024
2022	Ekaterina Agapova	Екатерина Агапова	4th vice-miss Krasa Rossii 2019	Did not compete		Ekaterina Agapova
Did not compete between 2019–2021
2018	Aim Isengalieva	Аим Исенгалиева	Miss Tourism Russia 2016 Finalist	Top 20		Vladimir Ilyin
Did not compete between 2015–2017
2014	Aidana Elemesova	Айдана Елемесова	Miss Kazakhstan 2013 Finalist	Unplaced		Usen Berdibaev
2013	Yuliya Kolesnik	Юлия Колесник	Appointed	Unplaced		Usen Berdibaev
