= Miss Grand Lebanon =

Lebanese beauty pageant title

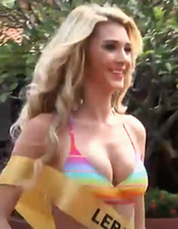
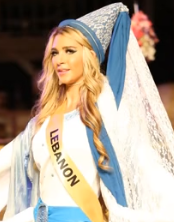
- Eliane Kerdy, Miss Grand Lebanon 2014
- Formation: 2013
- Type: Beauty pageant
- Headquarters: Beirut
- Location: Lebanon
- Members: Miss Grand International
- Official language: Arabic; English
- National director: Manar El Saaidy
- Parent organization: Rosotro Production (2013); Al-Sawsan International Foundation (2017–2019); Queen of Egypt (2026)

Miss Grand Lebanon is a female beauty pageant title awarded to Lebanese representatives competing at the Miss Grand International pageant. The title was first awarded in 2013 to a Canadian Lebanese model, Elizabeth Ojeil, after competing at the Miss Earth Canada 2023 pageant in late-August 2013 and finishing as the top 8 finalists. Ojeil later became the licensee of Miss Grand Lebanon the following year.

Since the establishment of Miss Grand International, Lebanon participated five times, all of its representatives were appointed and all went unplaced on the international stage.

== History ==
Lebanon debuted in the Miss Grand International pageant in 2013 when a finalist of Miss Earth Canada 2023, Elizabeth Ojeil, who is of Lebanon descent, was assigned by the Miss Earth Canada organizer, Rosotro Production, to represent Lebanon at the inaugural edition of Miss Grand International in Thailand. After finishing the international pageant, her brother Jean-Paul Ojeil was granted the right to send a Lebanese representative to the 2014 edition, and an actress from Zahlé, Eliane Kerdy, was elected.

From 2017 to 2019, Lebanese representatives for Miss Grand International were sent by a Beirut-based organizer led by former Miss Lebanon 1985 Sawsan Alsayed, Al-Sawsan International Foundation. However, no Miss Grand National was held; all titleholders during such a period were appointed.

Since 2020, due to a lack of licensees, no additional Miss Grand Lebanon has been elected.

== International competition ==
The following is a list of Lebanese representatives at the Miss Grand International contest.

Year	Representative	Original national title	Result	National director
2013	Elizabeth Ojeil	Top 8 Miss Earth Canada 2013	Unplaced	Ronaldo Trono
2014	Antonella Imad	—N/a	Unable to compete	Jean-Paul Ojeil
2014	Eliane Kerdy	Miss Zahle 2013	Unplaced	Jean-Paul Ojeil
2017	Christine Houry	—N/a	Unplaced	Sawsan Elsayed
2018	Anastasia Mitri	—N/a	Unplaced	Sawsan Elsayed
2019	Stephanie Karam	Miss Lebanon 2018 Finalist	Unplaced	Sawsan Elsayed
2020 – 2025: No representatives
2026	Perla Abou Rjeily	—N/a	TBA	Manar El Saaidy
