= Miss Grand New Zealand =

New Zealand beauty pageant title

- Formation: 2013
- Type: Beauty pageant
- Headquarters: Auckland
- Location: New Zealand
- Members: Miss Grand International
- Official language: English
- National director: Maria Siayngco; Dwayne Mallo
- Parent organization: Miss Kanorau New Zealand (2024–2025); Miss World New Zealand (2013 – 2019)

Miss Grand New Zealand is a national female beauty pageant title awarded to New Zealand representatives competing in the Miss Grand International pageant. The first titleholder was Rachel Hope Crofts, who previously won the Miss Model of the World New Zealand in the Miss World New Zealand 2013 pageant. Rachel represented New Zealand in the first Miss Grand International in Thailand but was unplaced.

From 2014 to 2019, the country representatives for Miss Grand International were either directly elected through the Miss World New Zealand pageant, or assigned one of the runners-up to the title. The contract between Miss World New Zealand and Miss Grand International was discontinued in late 2019 after declining to send a New Zealand candidate to partake in the 2019 international tournament in Venezuela due to security concerns. Since then, no New Zealand representatives at the Miss Grand International.

After six consecutive years of participating from 2013 to 2018, New Zealand representatives have never obtained any placements in Miss Grand International.

== International competition ==
The following is a list of New Zealand representatives at the Miss Grand International contest.

Color keys

- : Declared as the winner
- : Ended as a runner-up (Top 5)
- : Ended as a finalist (Top 10)
- : Ended as a semifinalist (Top 20/21)
- : Ended as special awards winner

Year	Locality	Miss Grand New Zealand	Title	Placement	Special Awards	National Director
2026	Dunedin	Emily Faulkner	Miss Grand New Zealand 2026 (Note: Supplemental title in the 2026 Miss Universe New Zealand pageant.)			Maria Siayngco and Dwayne Mallo
2025	Auckland	Gazelle Garcia	Miss Grand New Zealand 2025 (Note: Supplemental title in the 2025 Miss Universe New Zealand pageant, organized by the Kanorau New Zealand.)	Unplaced		Maria Siayngco and Dwayne Mallo
2024	Auckland	Alyssa Roberts	1st runner-up Miss Kanorau New Zealand 2024	Unplaced		Maria Siayngco and Dwayne Mallo
Did not compete between 2020–2023
2019	Auckland	Emma Gribble	Miss Grand New Zealand 2019 (Note: Supplemental title at the Miss World New Zealand 2019 pageant.)	Did not compete		Rose Foulger
2018	Auckland	Hayley Robinson	2nd runner-up Miss World New Zealand 2018	Top 20		Rose Foulger
2017	Auckland	Meghan Kenney	1st runner-up Miss World New Zealand 2017	Unplaced		Rose Foulger
2016	Auckland	Cosmiana Brown	2nd runner-up Miss World New Zealand 2016	Unplaced		Rose Foulger
2015	Auckland	Georgette Jackson	Miss Grand New Zealand 2015 (Note: Supplemental title at the Miss World New Zealand 2015 pageant.)	Withdrew		Rose Foulger
2014	Auckland	Maddieson White	Miss Grand New Zealand 2014 (Note: Supplemental title at the Miss World New Zealand 2014 pageant.)	Unplaced		Rose Foulger
2013	Manawatū	Rachel Hope Crofts	Miss Model of the World New Zealand 2013	Unplaced		Rose Foulger

== Gallery ==
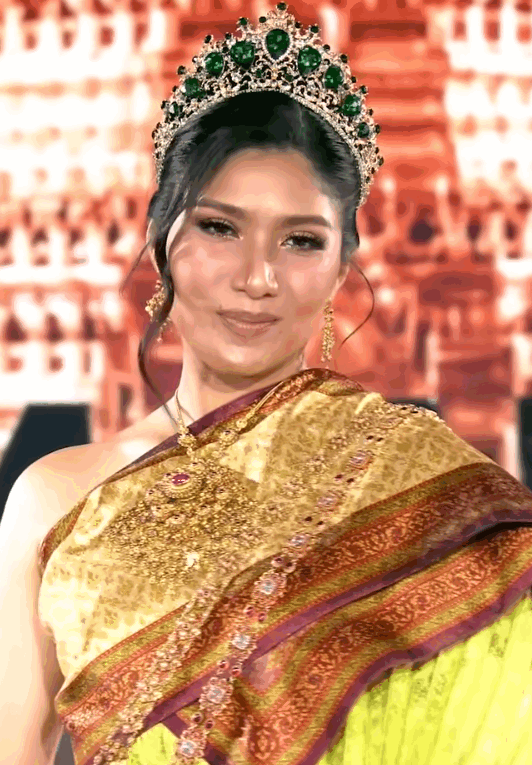
Gazelle Garcia,
Miss Grand New Zealand 2025

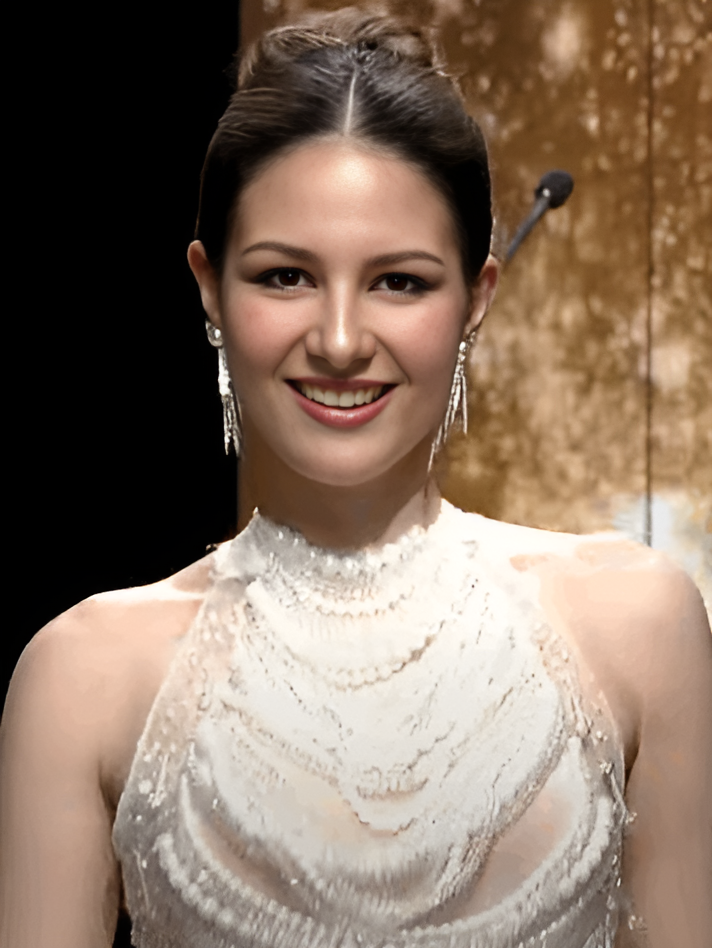
Alyssa Roberts,
Miss Grand New Zealand 2024

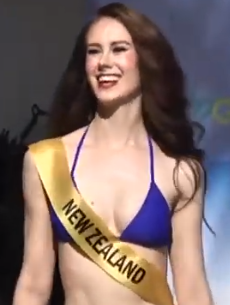
Georgette Jackson,
Miss Grand New Zealand 2015

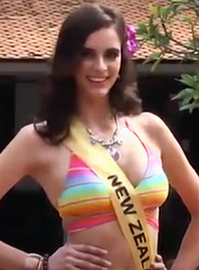
Maddieson White,
Miss Grand New Zealand 2014
