= Miss Grand Haiti =

Haitian beauty pageant title

- Formation: 2013
- Type: Beauty pageant
- Headquarters: Port-au-Prince
- Location: Haiti
- Members: Miss Grand International
- Official language: French
- National director: Kerlin Paulo
- Parent organization: Miss Haïti Caraïbes (2017 – 2025)

Miss Grand Haiti is a national title given to a woman chosen to represent Haiti at Miss Grand International. The title was first mentioned in 2013, when Miss Teen Haiti, Cassandre Paul, was appointed to compete at the inaugural edition of the Miss Grand International in Thailand; however, Paul withdrew for undisclosed reasons. Later in 2014, a New York-resident Haitian American, Lisa Drouillard, dominated herself as the Haitian contestant at the Miss Grand International 2014, and she was placed among the top 10 finalists, which is considered the only placement, to date, for Haiti at such a contest.

Since its first participation in 2014, no Miss Grand National has been held; the Miss Grand Haiti titleholders have usually been handpicked by the respective licensee; except in 2019, when the titleholder was determined through a 2009-established national pageant, Miss Haïti Caraïbes.

== History ==
Haiti debuted in the Miss Grand International in 2014 when Miss Teen USA 2011 finalist Lisa Drouillard, who resides in New York, purchased the license and appointed herself as the Haitian representative for the international contest held in late 2014 in Thailand, where she was named one of the final 10. Later in 2015, a medical student and former Miss Haiti Universe 2011 runner-up, Marie Exumé, obtained the license and took part in the 2015 international contest also in Thailand; but was unplaced.

In 2017, the Miss Grand Haiti license was transferred to a Port-au-Prince-based national pageant directed by Kerlin Paulo, Miss Haïti Caraïbes, where the main winners were sent to compete at the Miss Earth pageant. However, under the direction of Paulo, almost all of the country representatives for the Miss Grand International were appointed, except in 2019, when the first runner-up of the Miss Haïti Caraïbes contest was assumed to be Miss Grand Haiti.

== International competition ==
The following is a list of Haitian representatives at the Miss Grand International contest.

Color keys

- : Declared as the winner
- : Ended as a runner-up (Top 5)
- : Ended as a finalist (Top 10)
- : Ended as a semifinalist (Top 20/21)
- : Ended as special awards winner

Year	Hometown	Miss Grand Haiti	Original Title (Note: Title obtained for the national contest, not by appointment.)	Placement	Special Awards	National Director
2025	Petite Rivière de l'Artibonite	Valentina Dantès	Miss Dream Haïti 2019	Unplaced		Kerlin Paulo
2024	Port-au-Prince	Shaika Lorvengie Cade	Appointed	Unplaced		Kerlin Paulo
2023	Artibonite	Isnaida Compère	Top 8 Miss Haiti 2022	Unplaced		Kerlin Paulo
2022	Port-au-Prince	Paul Anne Estima	Appointed	Unplaced		Kerlin Paulo
2021	Port-au-Prince	Lynn St-Germain	Appointed	Unplaced		Kerlin Paulo
Did not compete in 2020
2019	Port-au-Prince	Josée Isabelle Riché	1st runner-up Miss Haïti Caraïbes 2019	Unplaced		Kerlin Paulo
2018	Port-au-Prince	Valérie Alcide	Appointed	Unplaced		Kerlin Paulo
2017	Port-au-Prince	Jennifer Alexis	Appointed	Unplaced		Kerlin Paulo
2016	Port-au-Prince	Rose Cathelyne Paul	1st runner-up Miss Haiti 2014	Did not compete		Chris E. Puesan
2015	Port-au-Prince	Marie Darline Exumé	2nd runner-up Miss Haiti Universe 2011	Unplaced		Gex Antoine
2014	Port-au-Prince	Lisa Drouillard	Finalist Miss Teen USA 2011	Top 10		Lisa Drouillard
2013	Port-au-Prince	Cassandre Paul	Miss Teen Haiti 2013	Did not compete		Cassandre Paul

== Winner Gallery ==
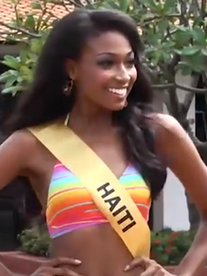
Miss Grand Haiti 2014
Lisa Drouillard

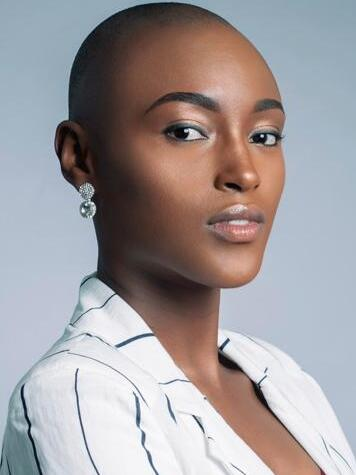
Miss Grand Haiti 2015
Marie Darline Exumé

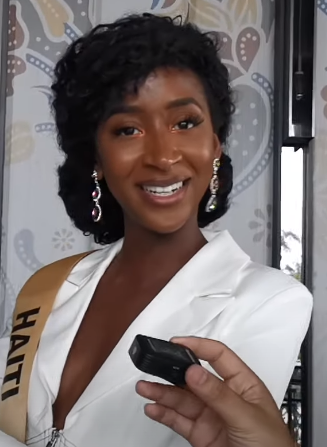
Miss Grand Haiti 2021
Lynn St-Germain

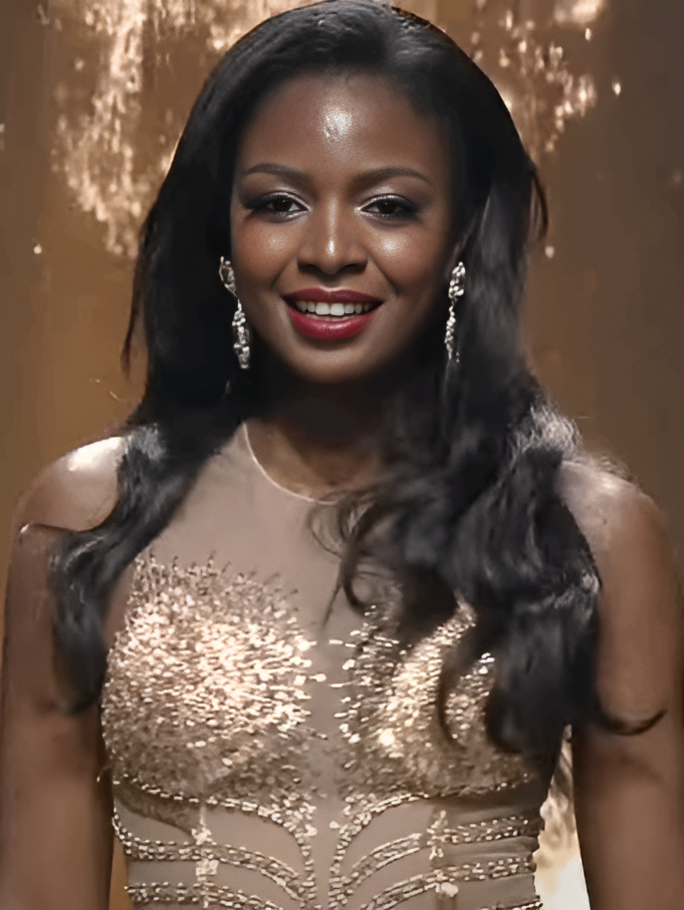
Miss Grand Haiti 2024
Shaika Lorvengie Cadet

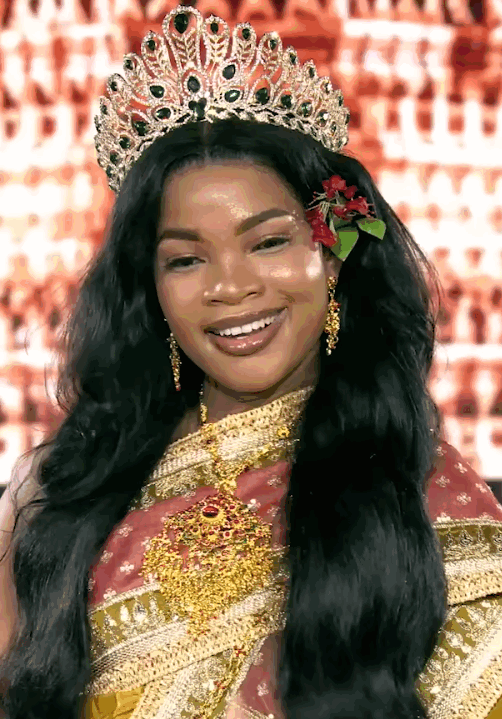
Miss Grand Haiti 2025
Valentchina Dantes

Miss Grand Haiti 2026
Estephanie Charles
