= Miss Grand Panama =

Panamian beauty pageant title

- Formation: 2014
- Type: Beauty pageant
- Headquarters: Panama City
- Location: Panama
- Members: Miss Grand International
- Official language: Spanish
- National director: César Anel Rodríguez
- Parent organization: Señorita Panamá (2025 – Present)

Miss Grand Panama licensee timeline

Miss Grand Panama is a national title bestowed upon a woman chosen to represent Panama at Miss Grand International. The title was first mentioned in 2014, when a Miss Panamá Mundo 2014 finalist, Carmen De Gracia, was appointed to represent the country at the Miss Grand International in Thailand. In the first few years of participation, most of the country representatives were appointed to the position without organizing the Miss Grand National pageant. However, some of them obtained the title at the multi-title national pageants, such as Reinas y Mister de Panamá in 2017, and Señorita Panamá in 2019 and 2022.

Since its first participation in 2014, Panamanian representatives obtained placement at the Miss Grand International pageant only twice, including the top 20 finalists in 2020, and the third runner-up in 2019.

== History ==
Panama debuted at Miss Grand International in 2014 when Carmen Librada De Gracia who represented Los Santos in Miss Panamá Mundo 2014, was appointed by pageant organizer, Marisela Moreno, to represent the country at Miss Grand International 2014 in Thailand. Later in 2016, Marisela lost the franchise to the director of Reinas y Mister de Panamá pageant, José Alberto Sosa Roner, who served as the licensee until 2018. The country representatives during the mentioned period were either appointed or determined through casting processes or the said pageant. The license was then taken over by another national pageant chaired by César Anel Rodríguez, Señorita Panamá, in 2019.

Under the direction of Rodríguez, Miss Grand Panama's titleholders were usually determined through his affiliated pageant, Señorita Panamá, in which the primary winner was sent to compete at the Miss Universe pageant. In late 2022, Rodríguez lost the license to a jewelry company, Chass Panamá, even though the country representative for that year's international contest had already been determined. The new licensee team led by Berly Castillo Antinori then appointed another titleholder as a replacement.

Gallery

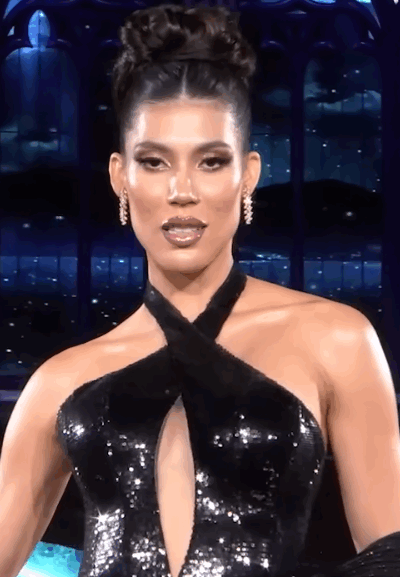
Miss Grand Panama 2025
Isamar Herrera

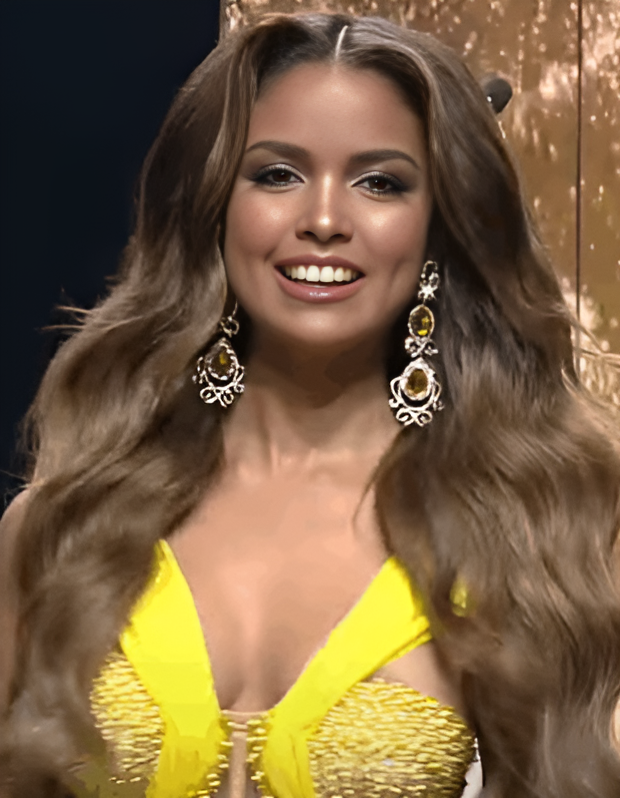
Miss Grand Panama 2024
Yanelys Bergantiño

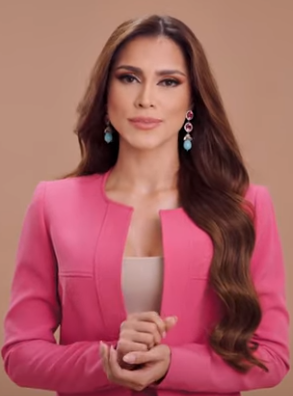
Miss Grand Panama 2023
Julia Leong

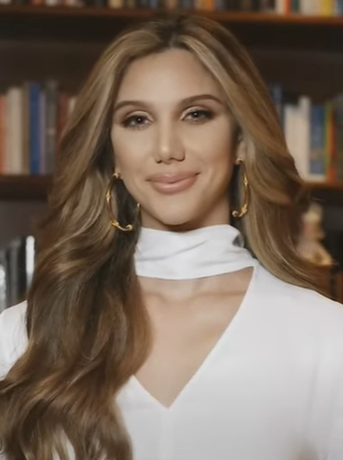
Miss Grand Panama 2022
Laura de Sanctis

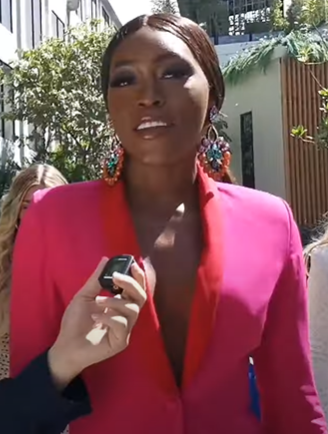
Miss Grand Panama 2021
Katie Caicedo

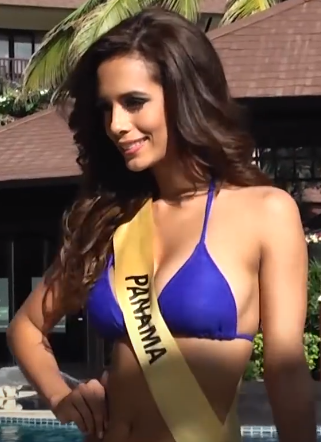
Miss Grand Panama 2015
Maria Suarez

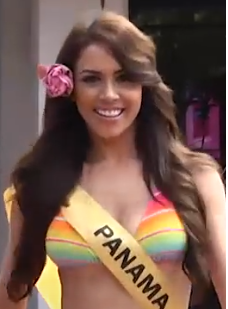
Miss Grand Panama 2014
Carmen de Gracia

== International competition ==
The following is a list of Panamanian representatives at the Miss Grand International contest.

Color keys

- : Declared as the winner
- : Ended as a runner-up (Top 5)
- : Ended as a finalist (Top 10)
- : Ended as a semifinalist (Top 20/21)
- : Ended as special awards winner

Year	Miss Grand Panama	Title	Placement	Special Awards	National Director
Did not compete in 2026
2025	Isamar Herrera	Appointed	Unplaced		César Anel Rodríguez
2024	Yanelys Bergantiño	Miss Panama Grand Slam 2024 – Grand International	Unplaced		Berly Castillo Antinori
2023	Julia Leong	Appointed	Unplaced		Berly Castillo Antinori
2022	Katheryn Yejas	Señorita Panamá 2021 – Grand International	Did not compete		César Anel Rodríguez
2022	Laura de Sanctis	Señorita Panamá 2017	Unplaced		César Anel Rodríguez
2021	Massiell Llamas	Appointed	Resigned		César Anel Rodríguez
2021	Katie Caicedo	Appointed	Unplaced		César Anel Rodríguez
2020	Angie Keith	Top 12 Señorita Panamá 2019	Top 20		César Anel Rodríguez
2019	Carmen Drayton	Señorita Panamá 2019 – Grand International	3rd Runner-up	Best in Swimsuit	César Anel Rodríguez
2018	Gabriela Mornhinweg	Miss Grand Panama 2018	Unplaced		José Alberto Sosa Roner
2017	Andrea Marìa Torres	Reinas Grand Panamá 2017	Unplaced		José Alberto Sosa Roner
2016	Selena Santamaria	Appointed	Unplaced		José Alberto Sosa Roner
2015	Maria Suarez	Appointed	Unplaced		Marisela Moreno
2014	Carmen de Gracia	Miss Panamá 2014 Finalist	Unplaced		Marisela Moreno
