= Miss Grand Hong Kong =

Beauty pageant in Hong Kong

- Formation: 2014
- Type: Beauty pageant
- Headquarters: Kowloon
- Location: Hong Kong
- Members: Miss Grand International
- Official language: English; Chinese
- National director: Chan Mei To
- Parent organization: Hong Kong International Pageant (2023 – Present)

Miss Grand Hong Kong is a national beauty pageant title given to women chosen to represent Hong Kong at the Miss Grand International pageant. It was first awarded in 2014 when the Macau Pageant Alliance (Chinese: 澳門選美連盟) chaired by Laura Li appointed a Brisbane-based Hong Kong Australian model, Joane Mo, to represent Hong Kong in the second edition of the aforementioned international contest in Thailand. The license of Miss Grand Hong Kong was transferred to the Guangzhou Zhoumeng Marketing Co., Ltd., Xin Fu Lai Enterprise Management Co., Ltd., Sasha Waseem, and Hong Kong International Pageant in 2016, 2021, 2022, and 2023, respectively.

Since its first participation in 2014, Hong Kong representatives have not yet obtained any placement in the Miss Grand International pageant; however, in 2021, its representative, Sen Yang, was voted into the final 20 in the swimsuit competition, which was one of the main sub-events of the contest.

== History ==
Miss Grand Hong Kong licensee timeline

Hong Kong joined Miss Grand International for the first time in 2014, and was represented by a Brisbane-based Hong Kong Australian model, Joane Mo (Mo Yin Shu 摹印述), who was appointed by Macau Pageant Alliance, which served as the licensee organ for both Miss Grand Hong Kong and Miss Grand Macau from 2014 to 2015. In 2016, the Hong Kong license was taken over by The Miss China (Chinese: 中国版图小姐) organizer from Guangzhou, Guangzhou Zhoumeng Marketing, Co., Ltd., which was also the franchise holder of Miss Grand China from 2013 to 2018. Under the management of Macau Pageant Alliance and Guangzhou Zhoumeng Marketing, all Hong Kong representatives at Miss Grand International were appointed.

After an absence in 2019 and 2020, the license was purchased by Xin Fu Lai Enterprise Management in 2021. An attempt to organize the first Miss Grand National contest was made this particular year; the press conference of the contest was held in Zhanjiang on March 13, 2021, and the grand final competition was scheduled for October 4, also in Zhanjiang, but the plan was entirely canceled due to the impact of China government travel restrictions during the COVID-19 pandemic, and the representative was instead appointed. The licensee also relinquished the franchise to a Television personality, Sasha Waseem, the following year.

Later in 2023, the license was transferred to the Hong Kong International Pageant (Chinese: 香港國際選美), a newly established organization chaired by former Miss Grand Hong Kong, Chan Mei To (陳美濤). The representative for this particular year was elected through the audition process. In addition to Miss Grand International, the new organization also holds the Hong Kong franchise of another international pageant, Miss Supranational.

Gallery

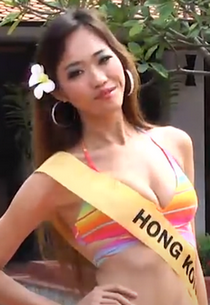
Miss Grand Hong Kong 2014
Joane Mo

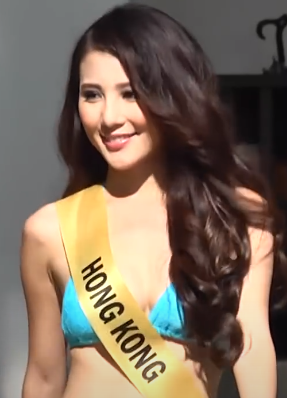
Miss Grand Hong Kong 2015
Janet Choi

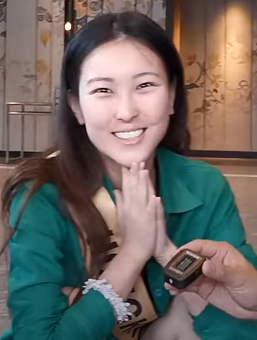
Miss Grand Hong Kong 2021
Sen Yang

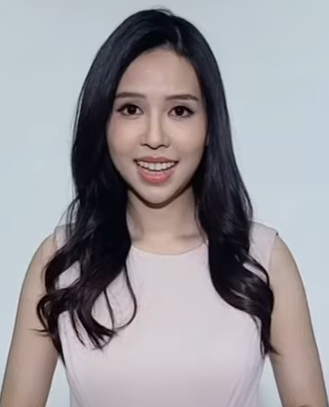
Miss Grand Hong Kong 2022
Chan Mei To

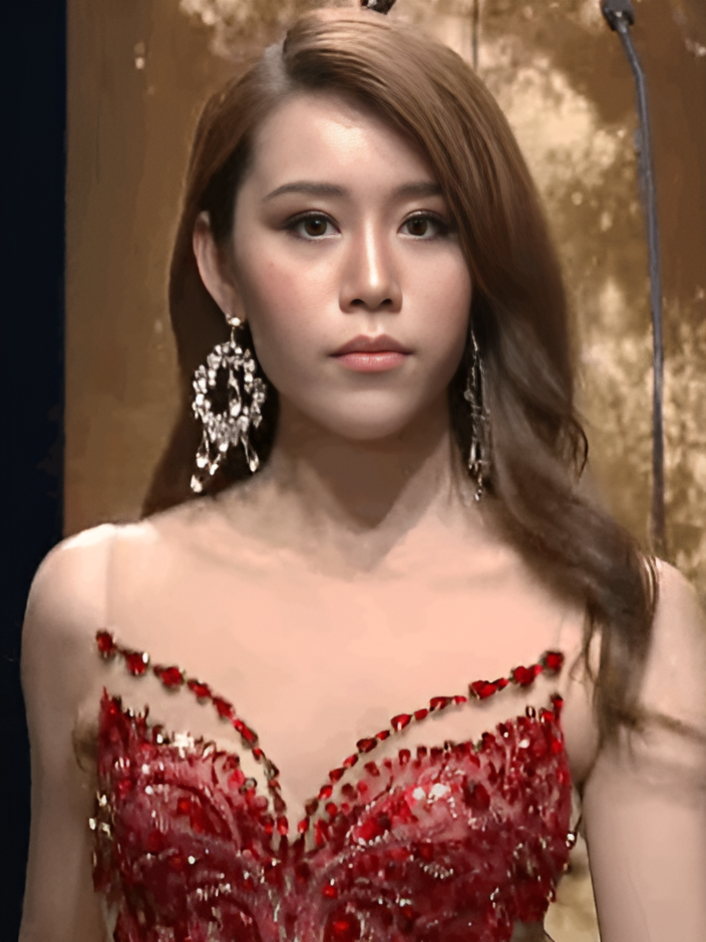
Miss Grand Hong Kong 2024
Kaylie Cheung

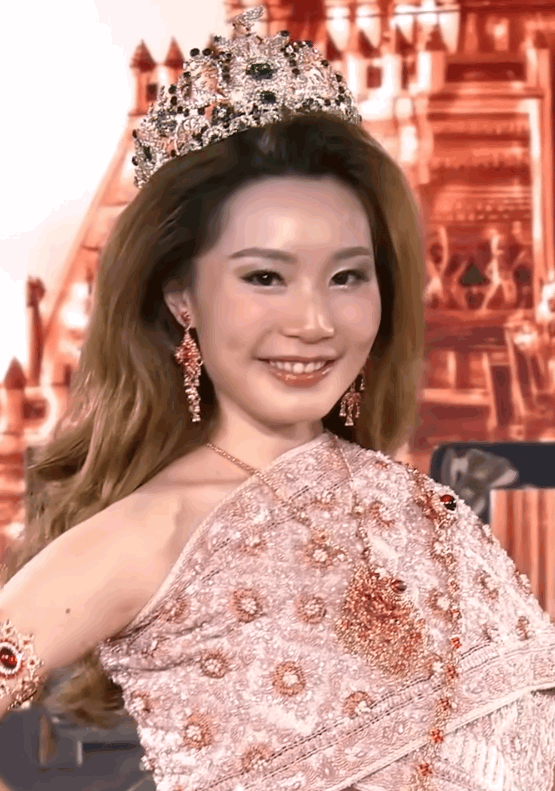
Miss Grand Hong Kong 2025
Jo An Ma

Miss Grand Hong Kong 2026
Yolanda Liu Xuebing

== Edition ==
=== Location and date ===
The following list is the edition details of the Miss Grand Hong Kong contest, which was held for the first time in 2026.

Edition	Date	Final venue	Entrants	Ref.
1st (Note: As Miss Grand Hong Kong and Miss Grand Macau 2026 pageant.)	29 April 2026	Hengqin, Zhuhai, China	23	

=== Competition result ===
Edition	Winner	Runners-up		Ref.
Edition	Winner	First	Second	Ref.
1st	Xuebing Liu (Kowloon)	Mua Lu (Toronto)	Not awarded	

== International competition ==
The following is a list of Hong Kong representatives at the Miss Grand International contest.

Color keys

- : Declared as the winner
- : Ended as a runner-up (Top 5)
- : Ended as a finalist (Top 10)
- : Ended as a semifinalist (Top 20/21)
- : Ended as special awards winner

Year	Miss Grand Hong Kong		Title	Placement	Special Awards	National Director
Year	Ramanized name	Chinese name	Title	Placement	Special Awards	National Director
2026	Xuebing Liu	劉雪冰	Miss Grand Hong Kong 2026 (Note: One of the main titles at the Miss Grand Macau–Hong Kong 2026 pageant)	TBA		Carry Xie Lu Dan
2025	Jo An Ma	馬祖雁	Appointed	Unplaced		Chan Mei To (陳美濤)
2024	Kaylie Cheung	張凱琳	Appointed	Withdrew		Chan Mei To (陳美濤)
2023	Ada Lo Tan Tan	盧丹丹	Miss Grand Hong Kong 2023 (Note: Determined through an audition/casting)	Unplaced		Chan Mei To (陳美濤)
2022	Chan Mei To	陳美濤	Appointed	Unplaced		Sasha Waseem
2021	Sen Yang Se-Eun	梁世恩	Appointed	Unplaced	Top 20 Best in Swimsuit	Shelley Wei (韦伊)
Did not compete between 2019 - 2020
2018	Eleanor Lam Man Yee	林敏儀	Appointed	Unplaced		Adam Lee
2017	Thisbe Law Hoi Lam	羅愷霖	Appointed	Unplaced		Adam Lee
2016	Rebecca Lau Hoi Yee	劉凱怡	Appointed	Unplaced		Adam Lee
2015	Janet Choi Hiu Ying	蔡曉瑩	Top 10 Miss Hong Kong 2014	Unplaced		Laura Li (李若瀅)
2014	Joane Mo Yin Shu	摹印述	Appointed	Unplaced		Laura Li (李若瀅)
