= Miss Grand Russia =

Beauty pageant in Russia

- Formation: 2013
- Type: Beauty pageant
- Headquarters: Moscow
- Location: Russia
- Members: Miss Grand International
- Official language: Russian
- National director: Edgar Saakyan
- Parent organization: Volga Models (2013 – 2020); Anton Sergeevi (2021 – 2022); Edgar Entertainment (2026 – present)

Miss Grand Russia is a national beauty pageant title awarded to Russian representatives competing at the Miss Grand International pageant. The title was first awarded in 2013, when a Moscow-based television personality, Anyuta Volkova, was appointed to compete in the inaugural edition of Miss Grand International in Thailand, where the headquarter of the pageant was located. From 2013 to 2020, the license of Miss Grand Russia belonged to the Cheboksary-based modeling agency, Volga Models, which is also the organizer of the Miss Tourism Russia pageant. However, the country representatives for Miss Grand International were not determined through the mentioned national contest; hand-picking was usually done.

In 2021, Volga Models lost the franchise to a queen maker, Anton Sergeevi, who also holds the Miss Grand licenses for Crimea and Siberia in 2021, as well as Mongolia and Belarus in 2022, but all of his affiliated Miss Grand titleholders were appointed. Sergeevi later lost the license to Polie Mari Manalo in 2023.

== History ==
Russia has participated in the Miss Grand International pageant since its inception in 2013. Even though Volga Model, which served as the licensee organ from 2013 to 2020, organizes its affiliated beauty contest named Miss Tourism Russia annually; however, all of its representatives in Miss Grand International were instead appointed to the title. Volga Model later lost the license to Anton Sergeevi in 2021.

Since its debut in 2013, Russian representatives got placements in Miss Grand International three times; the highest position is the top 10 finalists, obtained in 2014 by Yana Dubnik.

Gallery

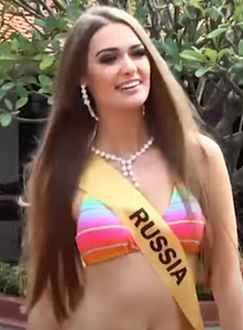
Yana Dubnik
Miss Grand Russia 2014

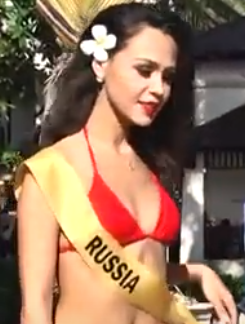
Ksenia Rozenberg
Miss Grand Russia 2015

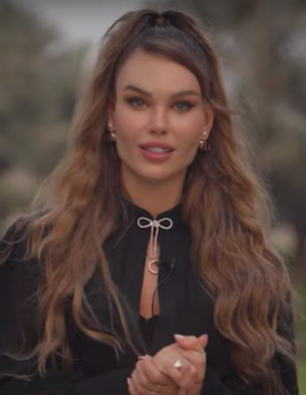
Anastasiia Volkonskaia
Miss Grand Russia 2023

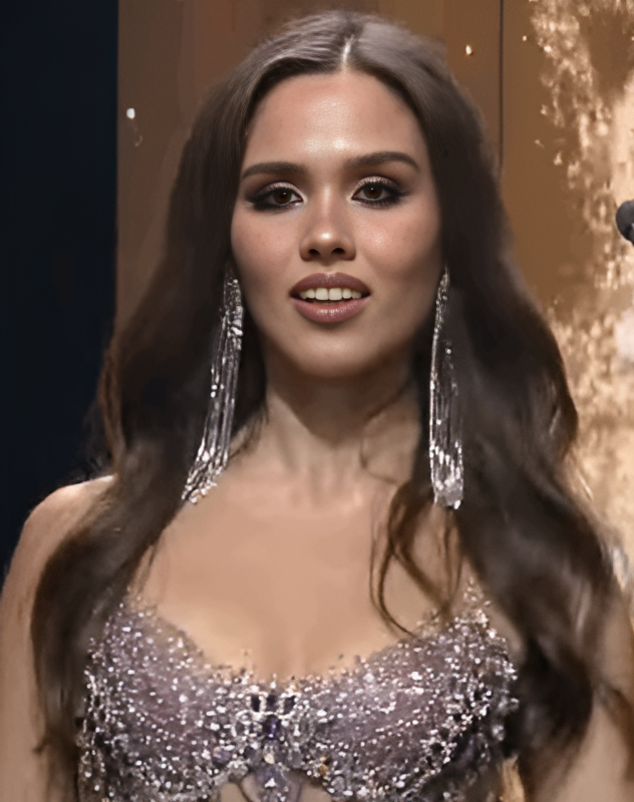
Renata Nadrshina
Miss Grand Russia 2024

Polina Ammasova
Miss Grand Russia 2026

== International competition ==
The following is a list of Russian representatives at the Miss Grand International contest.

Year	Representative		Original national title	Competition Performance		National director
Year	Romanized name	Russian name	Original national title	Placement	Other awards	National director
2013	Anyuta Volkova	Анна Волкова	Appointed	Unplaced	—N/a	Vladimir Ilyin
2014	Yana Dubnik	Яна Дубник	2nd runner-up Miss Russia 2011	Top 10	—N/a	Vladimir Ilyin
2015	Ksenia Rozenberg	Ксения Розенберг	Krasa Rossii 2014 Finalist	Withdrew during the competition		Vladimir Ilyin
2016	Daria Zatsepina	Дарья Зацепина	Miss Russia 2013 Finalist	Unplaced	—N/a	Vladimir Ilyin
2017	Svetlana Khokhlova	Светлана Хохлова	Miss Russian Radio 2014	Top 20	—N/a	Vladimir Ilyin
2018	Talia Aibedullina	Талия Айбедуллина	Miss Volga 2016	Top 20	—N/a	Vladimir Ilyin
2019	Kamilla Khusainova	Камилла Хусаинова	Miss Tourism Russia 2018	Unplaced	—N/a	Vladimir Ilyin
2020	Guzel Musina	Гузель Мусина	1st runner-up Miss Tourism Russia 2019	Unplaced	—N/a	Vladimir Ilyin
2021	Anastasiia Vozniuk	Анастасия Вознюк	Top 20 Miss Russia 2019	Resigned		Anton Sergeevi
2021	Alesia Semerenko	Алеся Семеренко	Miss Moscow 2018	Unplaced	—N/a	Anton Sergeevi
2022	Ekaterina Astashenkova	Екатерина Асташенкова	Top Model of the World Russia 2018	Unplaced	—N/a	Anton Sergeevi
2023	Anastasiia Volkonskaia	Анастасия Волконская	Appointed	Unplaced	Best Evening Gown	Polie Mari Manalo
2024	Renata Nadrshina	Рената Надршина	1st vice-miss Queen Beauty 2023	Unplaced	—N/a	Anastasiia Volkonskaia
2025	No representative					
2026	Polina Ammosova	Полина Аммосова	Appointed	TBA		Edgar Saakyan
Color keys for the Placements at Miss Grand International Declared as the winner Ended as a runner-up (Top 5) Ended as a finalist (Top 10) Ended as a semifinalist (Top 20/21)
