= Miss Grand Taiwan =

Taiwanese beauty pageant title

- Formation: 2014
- Purpose: Beauty pageant
- Headquarters: Kuala Lumpur
- Location: Malaysia
- Official language: Chinese
- National director: Lennard Tan (2023); Xie Luxingdan (2024)
- Parent organization: International Celebrity Pageant Group (2023–Present)
- Affiliations: Miss Grand International

Miss Grand Taiwan is a national beauty pageant title awarded to Taiwan representatives competing at the Miss Grand International contest. The title was first awarded in 2014 to a Taipei-based model, Chen Szu Yu (陳思妤), who then competed internationally at the parent stage held in Thailand, and was unplaced. The following titleholders were all appointed; no national pageant was organized.

In 2023, the license of Miss Grand International for Taiwan was purchased by the International Celebrity Pageant Group, a Kuala Lumpur-based pageant organizer headed by Lennard Tan and the owner of another international pageant, Miss & Mister Celebrity International.

Since the establishment of Miss Grand International, Taiwan has participated six times with all competitors unplaced.

== International competition ==
The following is a list of Taiwanese representatives at the Miss Grand International contest.

Year	Representative		Competition Performance		National director
Year	English	Chinese	Placement	Other award(s)	National director
2014	Kiki Chen Szu Yu	陳思妤	Unplaced	—N/a	Laura Li
2015	Viky Lin Yu Jou	林雨柔	Unplaced	—N/a	Self-dominated
2016	Grace Zhu Ri-Xing	陳采風	Unplaced	—N/a	Self-dominated
2017	No representatives				
2018	Tania Tan Yi Rong	譚怡蓉	Unplaced	—N/a	Self-dominated
No representatives from 2019 to 2022
2023	Erica Xiao Ting	筱婷	Unplaced	—N/a	Lennard Tan
2024	Yuhan Chen	陳雨涵	Unplaced	—N/a	Xie Luxingdan (谢鲁星丹)
2025	Xinya Chen	陳鑫雅	Unplaced		Xie Luxingdan (谢鲁星丹)

== Gallery ==
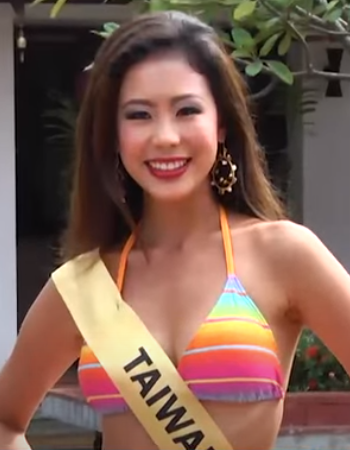
2014: Chen Szu Yu

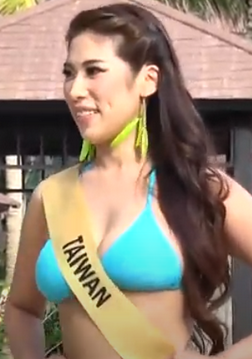
2015: Lin Yu Jou

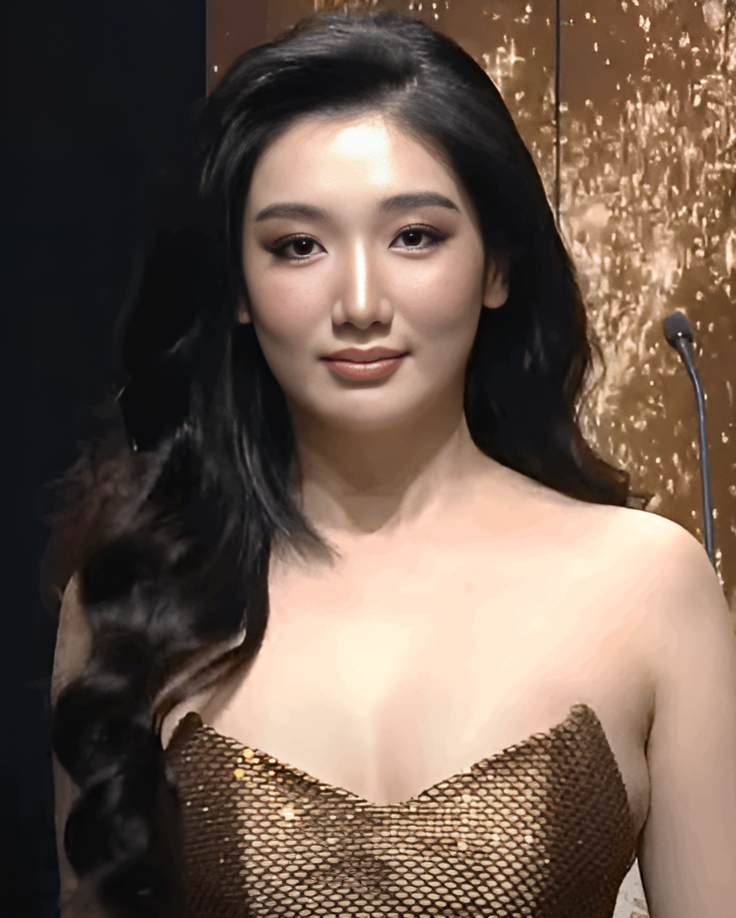
2024: Yuhan Chen

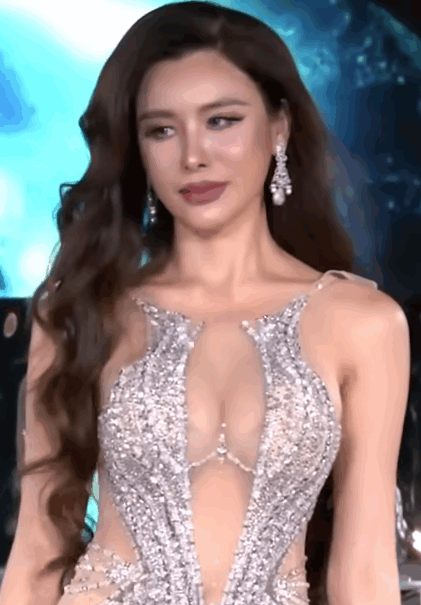
2025: Xinya Chen
