= Janelee Chaparro =

Puerto Rican beauty pageant winner

Janelee Marcus Chaparro Colón
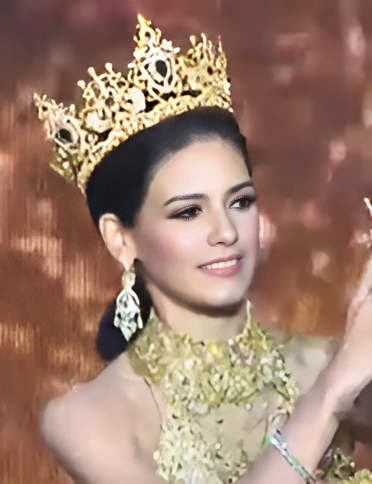
- Chaparro in 2014
- Born: Janelee Marcus Chaparro Colón; September 12, 1991 (age 35); Barceloneta, Puerto Rico
- Height: 5 ft 7 in (1.70 m)
- Beauty pageant titleholder
- Title: Miss Barceloneta World 2011; Miss Mundo de Puerto Rico 2012; Miss Grand International 2013
- Hair color: Brown
- Eye color: Brown
- Major competitions: Miss Mundo de Puerto Rico 2011; (1st Runner-Up); Miss World 2012; (Top 30); Miss Grand International 2013; (Winner)

Janelee Marcus Chaparro Colón (born September 12, 1991 in Barceloneta), known professionally as Janelee Chaparro, is a Puerto Rican model and beauty queen who represented Puerto Rico at Miss World 2012 where she finished in the Top 30 and at Miss Grand International 2013 where she became the first winner in the pageant's history.

== Personal life ==
Chaparro was born in Barceloneta, Puerto Rico to Sonia Colón and Sergio Chaparro, both pastors. In August, 2019, Colón gave birth to a baby girl.

== Pageant participation ==
=== Miss Mundo de Puerto Rico 2011 ===
Chaparro competed in Miss Mundo de Puerto Rico 2011, representing Barceloneta, where she placed 1st Runner-Up to Amanda Vilanova of San Juan. On April 26, 2012, Janelee was appointed as Miss Mundo de Puerto Rico 2012 in a press conference as no competition was held that year.

=== Miss World 2012 ===
Chaparro represented Puerto Rico at Miss World 2012 pageant, held at Ordos, China on August 18, 2012 where she placed in the Top 30.

=== Miss Grand International 2013 ===
Janelee represented Puerto Rico at the first Miss Grand International pageant on November 19, 2013, where she won becoming the first winner in the pageant's history. During her reign, she had travelled to Myanmar, Cambodia, Malaysia, South Sudan, Thailand, Puerto Rico, Singapore and Philippines.

Awards and achievements
Preceded by First Edition	Miss Grand International; 2013	Succeeded by Daryanne Lees
Preceded by First Edition	Miss Grand International Puerto Rico; 2013	Succeeded by Rebeca Valentin (Dorado)
Preceded by Amanda Vilanova (San Juan)	Miss Mundo de Puerto Rico; 2012	Succeeded by Nadyalee Torres (Caguas)
