= Miss Grand Mongolia =

Beauty pageant in Mongolia

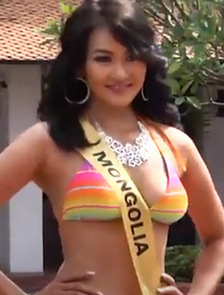
- Battogtokh Buyantogtokh; Miss Grand Mongolia 2014
- Formation: 2013
- Type: Beauty pageant
- Headquarters: Ulaanbaatar
- Location: Mongolia
- Members: Miss Grand International
- Official language: Mongolian
- National directors: Anton Sergeevi
- Parent organization: Anton Sergeevi Model Agency (2022) Former licensees: Miss Mongolia (2013 – 2015); Miss Mongolia Tourism Association (2017); Miss World Mongolia (2018)

Miss Grand Mongolia (Mongolian: Мисс Гранд Монгол) is a national beauty pageant title awarded to Mongolia representatives competing at the Miss Grand International contest. It was first awarded in 2013 to one of the Miss Mongolia 2013 finalists from Ulaanbaatar, Delgermaa Enkhtsogt, who then competed at the inaugural edition of Miss Grand International in Thailand, but was unplaced. By different directors, the following representatives were also assigned; no stand-alone pageant was held individually for Miss Grand.

Since the establishment of Miss Grand International, Mongolia participated six times but all of its representatives were unplaced.

== History ==
Mongolia debuted at Miss Grand International in 2013 after Delgermaa Enkhtsogt, a 20-year-old Ulaanbaatar-based business analyst who was also a finalist of Miss Mongolia 2013, was assigned by the Miss Mongolia Association to compete in the first edition of the said international tournament in Thailand in late November that year, but she received a non-placement. The license for Miss Grand Mongolia belonged to Miss Mongolia until 2015.

The license was granted by other organizers, including the Miss Mongolia Tourism Association, Miss World Mongolia, and Anton Sergeevi Model Agency, in 2017, 2018, and 2022, respectively.

Since the first competition in 2013, all Mongolian representatives for Miss Grand International were appointed; some of them were runners-up or finalists at other national pageants such as Miss Mongolia and Miss World Mongolia.

== International competition ==
The following is a list of Mongolian representatives at the Miss Grand International contest.

Year	Representative		Original national title	Competition Performance		National director
Year	Romanized name	Mongolian name	Original national title	Placement	Other award(s)	National director
2013	Delgermaa Enkhtsogt	Энхцогт Дэлгэрмаа	Miss Mongolia 2013 finalist	Unplaced	—N/a	Sumiya Dashtseren
2014	Battogtokh Buyantogtokh	Баттогтох Буянтогтох	2nd runner-up Miss Mongolia 2013	Unplaced	—N/a	Sumiya Dashtseren
2015	Munkhsoyolyn Khaliunaa	Мөнхсоёлын Халиунаа	1st runner-up Miss Mongolia 2014	Unplaced	—N/a	Sumiya Dashtseren
2017	Anujin Sugirjav	Анужин Сугаржавын	—N/a	Unplaced	—N/a	Gantogoo Nicole
2018	Burte-Ujin Anu	Ану Бөртэ-Үжин	1st runner-up Miss World Mongolia 2018	Unplaced	—N/a	Sumiya Dashtseren
2022	Elena Egorova	Елена Егорова	Miss Republic of Sakha 2020	Unplaced	—N/a	Anton Sergeevi
No representatives since 2023
