= Jihan Dimack =

Tanzanian model and beauty pageant titleholder born 1996

- Dimack in 2026
- Born: Jihan Mohin Dimachk; June 17, 1996 (age 30); Lebanon
- Height: 1.75 m (5 ft 9 in)
- Beauty pageant titleholder
- Title: Miss Universe Tanzania 2016; Miss Grand Tanzania 2026; Miss Grand International 2026
- Major competitions: Miss Universe Tanzania 2016; (Winner); Miss Universe 2016; (Unplaced); Miss Grand Tanzania 2026; (Winner); Miss Grand International 2026; (Winner)

Jihan Mohin Dimachk (born June 17, 1996) is a Tanzanian beauty pageant titleholder who won Miss Grand International 2026. She previously won Miss Universe Tanzania 2016 and represented Tanzania at Miss Universe 2016.

== Early life and career ==
Dimack has Tanzanian and Lebanese heritage. She has lived in Tanzania, Lebanon and Mozambique and has worked in China, where her professional experience has included modelling, sales and live commerce.

== Pageantry ==
Dimack began modelling at the age of 17 and subsequently competed in national beauty pageants. In 2014, she placed second runner-up at Miss Tanzania, according to The Citizen.

=== Miss Universe 2016 ===
Dimack won Miss Universe Tanzania 2016 and represented Tanzania at Miss Universe 2016, which took place in the Philippines in January 2017 and was unplaced. Iris Mittenaere of France won the title.

=== Miss Grand International 2026 ===
In 2026, Dimack represented the Mwanza Region at Miss Grand Tanzania, where she won the main title, allowing her to compete at Miss Grand International 2026.

Leading up to the international contest, she qualified for the Country's Power of the Year award, where reached the final four alongside representatives from Ecuador, Chile and Vietnam. During the finals, she progressed to the final question-and-answer round where she was asked to describe qualities an empowered woman should possess. She described having a "kind heart" as such quality, naming her mother as its embodiment and crediting her as an inspiration.

At the end of the event, she was named the winner, succeeding Emma Tiglao of the Philippines. Her victory marked the first title for her country and for any African country in the pageant's history.

== Advocacies ==
Dimack described herself as an advocate for peace, cultural diversity and women's empowerment.

Awards and achievements
| Preceded by Emma Tiglao | Miss Grand International; 2026 | Incumbent |
| Preceded by Beatrice Alex Akyoo | Miss Grand Tanzania; 2026 | Incumbent |
| Preceded by Lorraine Marriot | Miss Universe Tanzania; 2016 | Succeeded by Lilian Maraule |
