= Miss Grand Sierra Leone =

Sierra Leonean beauty pageant title

- Formation: 2017
- Type: Beauty pageant
- Headquarters: Freetown
- Location: Sierra Leone
- Members: Miss Grand International
- Official language: English
- National director: Swadu Natasha Beckley
- Parent organization: Althyri Media (2026 – present)

Miss Grand Sierra Leone is a national beauty pageant title awarded to Sierra Leonean representatives competing at the Miss Grand International contest. The title was first mentioned in 2017 when Rubie Timbo, who was affiliated with Swadu Beckley's pageant organizer IAMSL Pageant, was appointed to represent the country in the Miss Grand International contest in Vietnam.

Sierra Leone participated in Miss Grand International twice; in 2017 and 2018, but its both representatives were unplaced on the international stage. In 2019, the Sierra Leonean candidate for Miss Grand International 2019 was also decided but she withdrew.

== History ==
Sierra Leone made the debut in the Miss Grand International pageant in 2017 after the license was granted by Swadu Beckley, the director of Face of Sierra Leone organizer company named IAMSL Pageant, and a model from Freetown, Rubie Timbo, was assigned to represent the country internationally in Vietnam. However, Rubie was unable to join the international for undisclosed reasons and was replaced by former Miss Tourism Queen Sierra Leone, Nyallay Sia, The following representatives for the 2018 and 2019 international contests were also appointed; no Miss Grand National was held to determine titleholders.

In 2019, a 24-year-old model, Ramatulai Wurie, was hand-picked by the national licensee to compete at Miss Grand International 2019 in Venezuela, but she withdrew; security concerns in the host country was expected as the main reasons. She was later elected to compete at the Miss Supranational 2021 pageant in Poland, but went unplaced.

Due to lacking franchise holders, the Sierra Leonean representatives for Miss Grand International have not been determined since 2020.

== International competition ==
The following is a list of Sierra Leonean representatives at the Miss Grand International contest.

Year	Representative	Original national title	Competition performance		National director
Year	Representative	Original national title	Placement	Other awards	National director
2017	Rubie Timbo	—N/a	Unable to compete		Natasha Beckley
2017	Nyallay Sia Kamara	Miss Tourism Sierra Leone 2017	Unplaced	—N/a	Natasha Beckley
2018	Fanta Kabia	—N/a	Unplaced	—N/a	Natasha Beckley
2019	Ramatulai Wurie	—N/a	Unable to compete		Natasha Beckley
No representatives since 2020 - 2025
2026	TBA	TBA	TBA		
