= Miss Grand Jamaica =

Jamaican beauty pageant title

- Formation: 2016
- Type: Beauty pageant
- Headquarters: Kingston
- Location: Jamaica
- Members: Miss Grand International
- Official language: English
- National directors: Tahjé Bennett
- Parent organization: Discipline of Beauty (2016); Uzuri International (2017–2020); Andwar Pageant Group (2022); The Miss Jamaica (2025–present)

Miss Grand Jamaica is a national title bestowed upon a woman chosen to represent Jamaica at Miss Grand International. The title was first mentioned in 2016, when the 4th runner-up of Miss Universe Jamaica 2014, Dianne Brown, dominated herself as the country representative at the Miss Grand International 2016 competition held in Las Vegas, United States.

Since its first participation in 2016, no Miss Grand National has been held; the Miss Grand Jamaica titleholders have usually been determined through other national pageants, such as Miss Universe Jamaica and Miss Jamaica Imperial. However, an attempt to organize the Miss Grand Jamaica pageant was made in 2017, but the project was rescinded due to the financial issues.

Jamaican representatives obtained placement at the Miss Grand International pageant only once in 2016, when Dianne Brown was placed among the top 20 finalists and won the Best Social Media award.

== History ==
Jamaica debuted at Miss Grand International in 2016 when 4th runner-up Miss Universe Jamaica 2014, Dianne Brown, purchased the license and dominated herself as the country representative at the international contest held in Las Vegas, Nevada, where she was placed among the top 20 finalists and obtained the Best Social Media award. After returning to her home country, Brown attempted to organize an event to select the country representative for the Miss Grand International 2017, but the project was canceled, and the license was transferred to the Miss Universe Jamaica pageant, where one of the pageant runners-up in the particular years was assumed to be the Miss Grand Jamaica. After three years of non-placement, Miss Universe Jamaica terminated its partnership with Miss Grand International in 2021.

Later in 2022, the Andwar International Group, chaired by Andrew Harris, acquired the license, and the winner of their affiliated national pageant, Miss Jamaica Imperial, was appointed Miss Grand Jamaica 2022. In addition, the Andwar Group also holds the Jamaican licenses for Miss International, Miss Intercontinental, and The Miss Globe.

Gallery

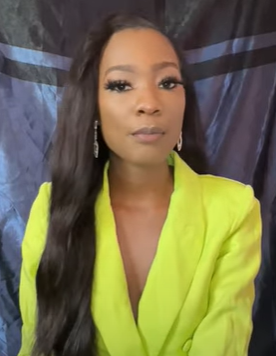
Kim-Marie Spence
Miss Grand Jamaica 2022

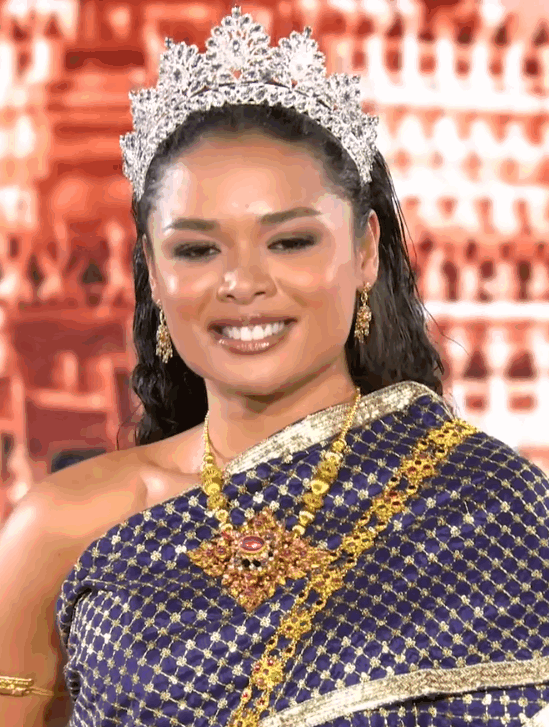
Matea Mahal Smith
Miss Grand Jamaica 2025

Simone Gardner
Miss Grand Jamaica 2026

== International competition ==
The following is a list of Jamaican representatives at the Miss Grand International contest.

Year	Representative	Original national title	International competition result		National director	Ref.
Year	Representative	Original national title	Placement	Other awards	National director	Ref.
2013	Shereka Miller	—N/a	Did not compete			
No representatives from 2014 to 2015
2016	Dianne Brown	4th runner-up Miss Universe Jamaica 2014	Top 20	Best Social Media	Dianne Brown	
2017	Jenaae Jackson	1st runner-up Miss Universe Jamaica 2017	Unplaced	—N/a	Karl Williams & Mark McDermoth	
2018	Kadejah Anderson	1st runner-up Miss Universe Jamaica 2018	Unplaced	—N/a	Karl Williams & Mark McDermoth	
2019	No representative				Karl Williams & Mark McDermoth	
2020	Monique Thomas	2nd runner-up Miss Universe Jamaica 2020	Unplaced	—N/a	Karl Williams & Mark McDermoth	
2021	No representative					
2022	Kim-Marie Spence	Queen Supreme of the Andwar Pageant 2022	Unplaced	—N/a	Andrew Harris	
No representatives from 2023 to 2024
2025	Matea Mahal Smith	2nd runner-up Miss Universe Jamaica 2025	Unplaced		Tahjé Bennett	
2026	Simone Gardner	Top 15 Miss Universe Jamaica 2025			Tahjé Bennett	
Color keys for the Placements at Miss Grand International Declared as the winner Ended as a runner-up (Top 5) Ended as a finalist (Top 10) Ended as a semi-finalist (Top 20/21)
