= Miss Grand Moldova =

Beauty pageant in Moldova

- Formation: 2013
- Type: Beauty pageant
- Headquarters: London
- Location: England
- Members: Miss Grand International
- Official language: Romanian; English
- President / National director: Daniela Costin (since 2026)
- Parent organization: Crown Circle UK

Miss Grand Moldova is a national beauty pageant title awarded to Moldovan representatives competing at the Miss Grand International pageant. The title was first awarded in 2013, when Ernest Hadrian Böhm, director of the Romania-based event organizer Exclusive Events International, appointed the winner of Miss Earth Moldova 2012, Alyona Chitoroaga, to represent Moldova at the inaugural edition of the international pageant in Thailand. Chitoroaga was unplaced in the competition.

Exclusive Events International held the Miss Grand Moldova license until its partnership with Miss Grand International ended in 2019. After a seven-year absence, the license was acquired in 2026 by a London-based pageant organizer Crown Circle UK, led by an entrepreneur Daniela Costin, marking Moldova's return to the competition.

== History ==
Since the inception of Miss Grand International in 2013, Moldova has only occasionally participated in the competition. The country's first representative was Alyona Chitoroaga, winner of Miss Earth Moldova 2012, who was appointed by Ernest Hadrian Böhm, director of Exclusive Events International, to compete at the inaugural edition.

Subsequent representatives of Moldova were all Romanian citizens. They were selected through Romanian national pageants, including Miss Universe Romania and Miss Tourism Metropolitan International Romania, both of which were organized by Exclusive Events International.

As of 2025, no Moldovan representative has placed at Miss Grand International.

Gallery

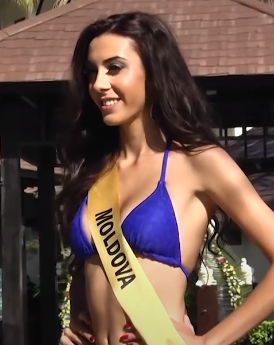
Miss Grand Moldova 2015
Bianca Mihalache

== International competition ==
The following is a list of Moldovan representatives at the Miss Grand International contest.

Year	Representative	Original national title	International result	
Year	Representative	Original national title	Placement	Other awards
2013	Alyona Chitoroaga	Miss Earth Moldova 2012	Unplaced	—N/a
2015	Bianca Mihalache	1st runner-up Miss Universe Romania 2012	Unplaced	—N/a
2016	Crina Stinca	—N/a	Unable to compete	
2016	Alina Mihaela Staicu	—N/a	Unplaced	—N/a
2018	Alexandra Predus	Miss Tourism Metropolitan International Romania 2016	Unplaced	—N/a
No representatives from 2019 to 2025
2026	Regina Ganzenko	—N/a	TBA	TBA
