= Miss Grand Slovakia =

Beauty pageant in Slovakia

- Formation: 2013
- Type: Beauty pageant
- Headquarters: Bratislava
- Location: Slovakia
- Members: Miss Grand International
- Official language: Slovak; Hungarian
- National director: Katarína Ficelová (2025)
- Parent organization: Black & White Productions (2025); Felvidék Szépe (2015 – 2017); Oklamčák Production (2013 – 2014)

Miss Grand Slovakia is a national beauty pageant title awarded to Slovak representatives competing at the Miss Grand International pageant. The title was first mentioned in 2013 when a Miss Slovakia-related personnel, Ján Oklamčák, obtained the license and subsequently appointed Denisa Paseciaková to compete at the inaugural edition of Miss Grand International in Thailand, where she was named the second runner-up, which is considered the highest and only placement, to date, for Slovak representatives at the mentioned international tournament.

From 2015 to 2017, the license belonged to Kósa Annamária, the organizer of the Felvidék Szépe pageant, so the Miss Grand Slovakia titleholders during the said period were determined through such an event. However, as the mentioned national pageant was dissolved in 2018, there has been no Miss Grand International license holder in Slovakia ever since.

== History ==
Slovakia debuted in the Miss Grand International in 2013, and its representative, Denisa Paseciaková, who was appointed by Ján Oklamčák of Oklamčák Production, was ranked as the 2nd runner-up; the following representative, who competed in 2014, was also appointed by the same licensee. Later in 2015, Oklamčák lost the license to Kósa Annamária, founder of the Hungarian-Slovak beauty contest Felvidék Szépe, which was founded in 2014, and the contest's main winners were sent to compete at the Miss Universe as Hungarian representatives. Under the direction of Annamária, the first runners-up of her affiliated pageant were named Miss Grand Slovakia; however, the license of Miss Universe Hungary was taken over by another organizer in 2017, causing the Miss Grand Slovakia title to be promoted as the main award instead.

After losing the franchise of Miss Universe Hungary in 2017, the Felvidék Szépe pageant was dissolved the following year, and, hitherto, the license of Miss Grand Slovakia was not purchased by any other agents.

== International competition ==
The following is a list of Slovak representatives at the Miss Grand International contest.

Year	Representative	Original national title	International result		Licensee
Year	Representative	Original national title	Placement	Other awards	Licensee
2013	Denisa Paseciaková	Appointed	2nd runner-up	—N/a	Ján Oklamčák
2014	Veronika Janisova	Appointed	Unplaced	—N/a	Ján Oklamčák
2015	Andrea Barthalosova	1st runner-up Felvidék Szépe 2015	Unplaced	—N/a	Kósa Annamária
2016	Viktoria Nagyova	1st runner-up Felvidék Szépe 2016	Unplaced	—N/a	Kósa Annamária
2017	Klaudia Kurucz	Felvidék Szépe 2017	Unplaced	—N/a	Kósa Annamária
2018 – 2024: No representatives
2025	Mária Glatzová	Miss Grand Slovak Republic 2025 (Note: Main title in the Miss Slovak Republic 2025 pageant)	Unplaced	—N/a	Katarína Ficelová
Color keys for the Placements at Miss Grand International Declared as the winner Ended as a runner-up (Top 5) Ended as a finalist (Top 10) Ended as a semifinalist (Top 20/21)

== Gallery ==
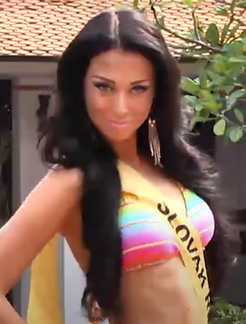
Veronika Janisova
Miss Grand Slovakia 2014

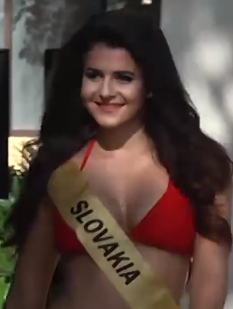
Andrea Barthalosova
Miss Grand Slovakia 2015

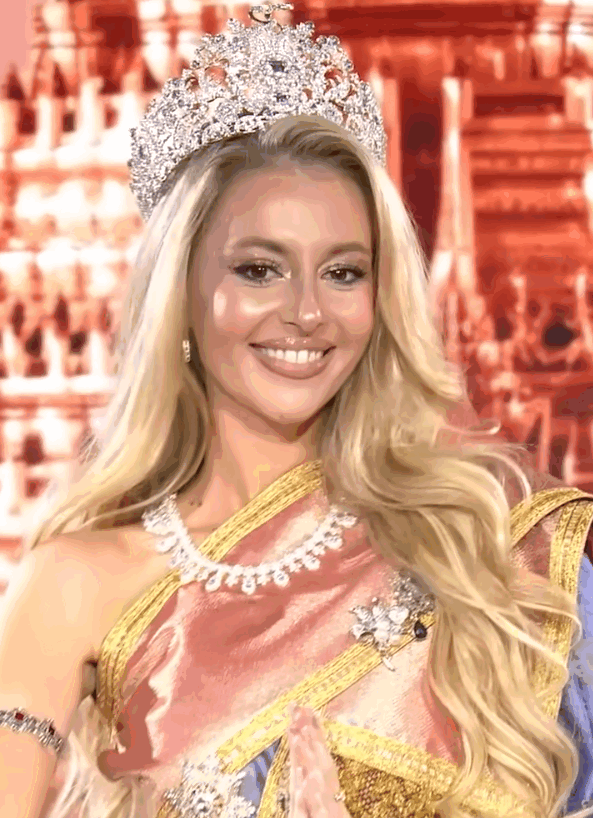
Mária Glatzová
Miss Grand Slovakia 2025
