= Miss Grand Estonia =

Beauty pageant in Estonia

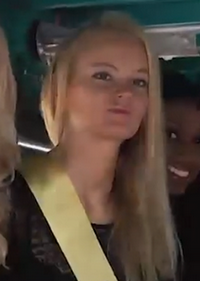
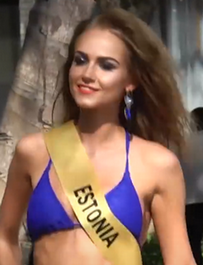
- Maria Raja; Miss Grand Estonia 2014 Anna-Liisa Virkus; Miss Grand Estonia 2015
- Formation: 2013
- Type: Beauty pageant
- Headquarters: Stockholm
- Location: Sweden
- Members: Miss Grand International
- Official language: English
- National director: Peter Hadward
- General director: Kersten Liba
- Parent organization: Miss Queen of Scandinavia (2013 – 2019)
- Website: MissQueenOfScandinavia.com

Miss Grand Estonia is a national beauty pageant title awarded to Estonian representatives competing at the Miss Grand International pageant. The title was first awarded in 2013, when a professional model from Novorossiysk, Evgeniia Forkash, was assigned to represent Estonia at the inaugural edition of the mentioned international contest in Thailand.

Since the first partaking in 2013, the license of Miss Grand Estonia belonged to a sub-continental pageant based in Stockholm, Miss Queen of Scandinavia; however, its partnership with Miss Grand International was terminated in 2020, and, hitherto, the Miss Grand Estonia license was not purchased by any other agency.

== History ==
Estonia debuted in the Miss Grand International pageant in 2013, represented by a Russian-based model from Novorossiysk, Evgeniia Forkash, who was assigned to participate by the Miss Queen of Scandinavia organization (MQOS), a Stockholm-based pageant chaired by Peter Hadward, but she was unplaced. In the following years, the country representatives at such an international tournament were either determined through the Miss Queen of Scandinavia pageant or directly hand-picked by the director.

Since the first competition in 2013, Estonian representatives have never been placed in Miss Grand International.

== International competition ==
The following is a list of Estonian representatives at the Miss Grand International contest.

Year	Representative	Original national title	International result	
Year	Representative	Original national title	Placement	Other awards
2013	Evgeniia Forkash	Miss Golden TiTi 2013	Unplaced	—
2014	Maria Raja	Eesti Tippmodell Season 2 Finalist	Unplaced	—
2015	Anna Liisa Virkus	Appointed	Unplaced	—
2016	Merylin Nau	Appointed	Unplaced	—
2017	Susanna Lehtsalu	Appointed	Unplaced	—
2018	Karolin Kippasto	Miss Grand Estonia 2018	Unplaced	—
2019	Elisse Randmma	Appointed	Unplaced	—
No representatives since 2020
