= Miss Grand Norway =

Beauty pageant in Norway

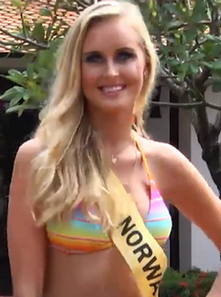
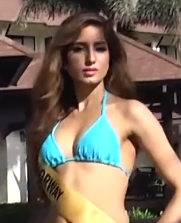
- Caroline Munthe; Miss Grand Norway 2014 Sonia Singh; Miss Grand Norway 2015
- Formation: 2013
- Type: Beauty pageant
- Headquarters: Stockholm
- Location: Sweden
- Members: Miss Grand International
- Official language: English; Norwegian
- National director: Knut Yrvin
- Parent organization: Miss Norway (2013 – 2016, 2024); Miss Queen of Scandinavia (2018)
- Website: MissQueenOfScandinavia.com

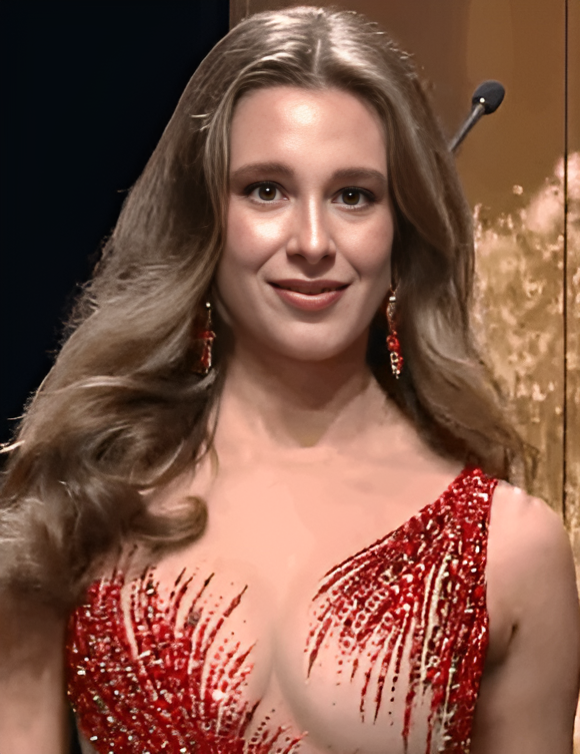
Madeleine Malmberg, Miss Grand Norway 2024

Miss Grand Norway is a national beauty pageant title awarded to Norwegian representatives competing at the Miss Grand International pageant. The title was first introduced in 2013 when a 21-year-old model from Flekkefjord, Christine Frestad, was appointed as Miss Grand Norway, after obtaining the 3rd runner-up position in the Miss Norway 2013 pageant.

From 2013 to 2016, the license of Miss Grand Norway belonged to a national pageant, Miss Norway. However, after an absence in 2017, the license was then obtained by a sub-continental pageant headquartered in Stockholm, Miss Queen of Scandinavia, where the Miss Grand Norway title was considered one of the supplement awards in the event.

== History ==
Norway made its first appearance at the Miss Grand International stage in 2013 after Christine Frestad was assigned by the Miss Norway organization to compete in the inaugural edition of the mentioned tournament in Thailand; Frestad was the third runner-up in Miss Norway 2013 pageant. From 2013 to 2016, under the management of Miss Norway, the Norwegian candidates for Miss Grand International were selected through the Miss Norway pageant in that particular year. Miss Norway terminated its partnership with Miss Grand International in 2017.

One year after the franchise relinquishment, Miss Queen of Scandinavia, a Sweden-based sub-continental pageant chaired by Peter Hadward, obtained the license, and Norwegian representative for that year Miss Grand International was determined through the mentioned pageant.

Since the first competition in 2013, Norwegian representatives have never been placed in Miss Grand International.

== International competition ==
The following is a list of Norwegian representatives at the Miss Grand International contest.

Year	Representative	Original national title	International result		National director
Year	Representative	Original national title	Placement	Other awards	National director
2013	Christine Frestad	3rd runner-up Miss Norway 2013	Unplaced	—	Armand Bye
2014	Caroline Munthe	3rd runner-up Miss Norway 2014	Unplaced	—	Armand Bye
2015	Sonia Singh	2nd runner-up Miss Norway 2015	Unplaced	—	Armand Bye
2016	Yasmin Osee Aakre	1st runner-up Miss Norway 2016	Unplaced	—	Armand Bye
2017	No representative				
2018	Maria Barbantonis	Miss Grand Norway 2018	Unplaced	—	Peter Hadward
No representatives from 2019 - 2023
2024	Madeleine Malmberg	2nd runner-up Miss Norway 2023	Withdrew		Knut Yrvin
Color keys for the Placements at Miss Grand International Declared as the winner Ended as a runner-up (Top 5) Ended as a finalist (Top 10) Ended as a semifinalist (Top 20/21)
