= List of Romania representatives at international beauty pageants =

This is a list of Romania's representatives at major international beauty pageants.

== Big Four pageants ==
Romania has been represented in the Big Four international beauty pageants, the four major international beauty pageants for women. These are Miss World, Miss Universe, Miss International and Miss Earth.

Color key

- Declared as Winner
- Ended as runner-up
- Ended as one of the finalists or semifinalists

=== Representatives at Miss Universe ===
Year	Miss Universe Romania	Placement	Special Awards
1991	Daniela Nane	Unplaced	
1992	Corina Corduneanu	Unplaced	
1993	Angelica Nicoara	Unplaced	
1994	Mihaela Ciolacu	Unplaced	
1995	Monika Grosu	Unplaced	
1996	Roberta Anastase	Unplaced	
1997	Diana Maria Urdareanu	Unplaced	
1998	Juliana Elena Verdes	Unplaced	
Did not compete between 1999–2008
2009	Elena Bianca Constantin	Unplaced	
2010	Oana Paveluc	Unplaced	
2011	Larisa Popa	Unplaced	
2012	Delia Monica Duca	Unplaced	
2013	Roxana Oana Andrei	Unplaced	
Did not compete between 2014–2015
2016	Teodora Dan	Unplaced	
2017	Ioana Mihalache	Unplaced	
2018	Did not compete		
2019	Dorina Chihaia	Unplaced	
2020	Bianca Tirsin	Unplaced	
2021	Carmina Olimpia Cotfas	Unplaced	
Did not compete since 2022—2023
2024	Loredana Salanță	Unplaced	
2025	Cătălina Jacob	Unplaced	
2026	Sabina-Gabriela Parmac	TBA	

=== Representatives at Miss World ===
Year	Miss World Romania	Placement	Special Awards
1990	Mihaela Raescu	Unplaced	
1991	Gabriela Dragomirescu	Unplaced	
1992	Camelia Ilie	Unplaced	
1994	Leona Dalia Voicu	Unplaced	
1995	Dana Delia Pintilie	Unplaced	
1996	Carmen Radoi	Unplaced	
Did not compete in 1997–1998
1999	Nicoleta Luciu	Unplaced	
2000	Aleksandra Cosmoiu	Unplaced	
2001	Vanda Petre	Unplaced	
2002	Cleopatra Popescu	Unplaced	
2003	Patricia Filomena Chifor	Unplaced	
2004	Adina Maria Cotuna	Unplaced	
2005	Raluca Voina	Unplaced	
2006	Ioana Boitor	1st Runner-up	
2007	Elena Roxana Azoitei	Unplaced	
2008	Did not compete		
2009	Loredana Violeta Salanta	Unplaced	
2010	Lavinia Postolache	Unplaced	
2011	Alexandra Stănescu	Unplaced	
2012	Did not compete		
2013	Andreea Chiru	Unplaced	
2014	Bianca Fanu	Unplaced	
2015	Natalia Onet	Unplaced	
2016	Diana Dinu	Unplaced	
2017	Mihaela Bosca	Unplaced	
Did not compete since 2018–2022
2023	Ada-Maria Ileana	Unplaced	
2025	Alexandra-Beatrice Cătălin	Unplaced	

=== Representatives at Miss International ===
Year	Miss International Romania	Placement	Special Awards
2004	Ramona-Angela Raut	Unplaced	
Did not compete in 2005–2008
2009	Iuliana Capsuc	Unplaced	
2010	Did not compete		
2011	Andrada Vilciu	Unplaced	
2012	Did not compete		
2013	Diana Maria Tiron	Unplaced	
2014	Anca Francesca Neculaiasa	Unplaced	
2015	Andreea Chiru	Unplaced	
Did not compete in 2016–2017
2018	Bianca Tirsin	3rd Runner-up	
2019	Andreea Coman	Unplaced	
Due to the impact of COVID-19 pandemic, no pageant in 2020 and 2021
2022	Ada-Maria Ileana	Unplaced	
2023	Did not compete		
2024	Miriam Tigau	Unplaced	
2025	Cătălina Popescu	Unplaced	
2026	Did not compete		

=== Representatives at Miss Earth ===
Year	Miss Earth Romania	Placement	Special Awards
2005	Adina Dimitru	Unplaced	
2006	Nicoleta Motei	Unplaced	
2007	Alina Gheorge	Top 16	
2008	Ruxandra Popa	Top 16	
2009	Did not compete		
2010	Andreea Capsuc	Unplaced	
2011	Jihan Shanabl	Unplaced	
2012	Iulia Monica Dumitrescu	Unplaced	
2013	Ioana Mihalache	Unplaced	
2014	Andreea Chiru	Unplaced	
2015	Anca Neculaiasa-Pavel	Unplaced	
2016	Crina Stîncă	Unplaced	
2017	Did not compete		
2018	Denisse Andor	Top 18	(bronze) Long Gown (Fire group)
2019	Did not compete		
2020	Tatiana Usatii	Unplaced	
2021	Did not compete		
2022	Aura Dosoftei	Unplaced	
2023	Georgiana Catalina Popescu	Unplaced	Top 3 Online Voting
2024	Did not compete		

== Other pageants ==
=== Representatives at Miss Supranational ===
Year	Miss Supranational Romania	Placement	Special Awards
2009	Anca Vasiu	Unplaced	
2010	Laura Bărzoiu	Top 20	
2011	Denisia Parlea	Unplaced	
2012	Madalina Horlescu	Unplaced	
2013	Natalia Rus	Unplaced	
2014	Elena Zama	Top 20	
2015	Elisabeta Eliza Ancău	Unplaced	
2016	Sînziana Sîrghi	Top 25	
2017	Bianca Tirsin	2nd Runner up	Top 10 (8th) - Best in Swimsuit
2018	Andreea Coman	Top 10	Miss Supranational Europe
2019	Alexandra Stroe	Unplaced	
2020	Due to the impact of COVID-19 pandemic, no pageant in 2020		
2021	Michela Ciornea	Top 12	
2022	Andra Tache	Top 24	
2023	Ioana Hotaran	Unplaced	
2024	Kira Andreea Ioana Stan	Top 25	
2025	Ana Maria Ecaterina Mozaceanu	Unplaced	
2026	Luiza Mocanu	Unplaced	

=== Representatives at Miss Grand International ===
Year	Miss Grand Romania	Placement	Special Awards
2013	Iuliana-Stefania Vasile	Unplaced	
2014	Delia Monica Duca	Unplaced	
2015	Georgiana Paula Radu	Unplaced	
2016	Ioana Mihalache	Unplaced	
2017	Did not compete		
2018	Ana Maria Laura Șerban	Did not compete	
2019	Ramona Vatamanu	Unplaced	
Did not compete in 2020–2022
2023	Denisse Vivienne Andor	Unplaced	
Did not compete

=== Representatives at Miss Intercontinental ===
Year	Miss Intercontinental Romania	Placement	Special Awards
2005	Ana Florincuta	Top 16	
2005	Laura Florincuta	Top 16	
2006	Roxana Florina Curelea	Unplaced	
2007	Panna Boroka Kopacz	Unplaced	
2008	Loredana Barbu	Unplaced	
2009	Maria Lia Bledea	Unplaced	
2010	Alina Clapa	Unplaced	
2011	Delia Monica Duca	Unplaced	
2012	Sinziana Sirghi	Unplaced	
2013	Teodora-Ioana Saramet	Unplaced	
2014	Emanuela Tancau	Unplaced	
2015	Adriana Radmilia Dumitru Iovanescu	Unplaced	
2016	Denisa Mladin	Unplaced	
2017	Monica Ionela Buda	Unplaced	
2018	Denisa Zsifkov	Unplaced	
2019	Anna Michela Ciornea	Top 20	
2020	Due to the impact of COVID-19 pandemic, no pageant in 2020		
2021	Florina Amaritei	Unplaced	
2022	Denisa Andreea Malacu	Unplaced	
2023	Alexandra Dobrica	Unplaced	Miss Sunrise Resort Award
2024	Andreea Monica Bradea	Unplaced	
2025	Kira Andreea Ioana Stan	Top 12	

== See also ==
- Miss Romania
- Miss Grand Romania
