= Miss Cuba =

Beauty pageant

Miss Cuba Organization
- Formation: 1927; 99 years ago
- Type: Beauty pageant
- Headquarters: Havana
- Location: Cuba
- Members: Miss Universe Miss Charm Miss Cosmo
- Official language: Spanish

The Miss Cuba is a beauty pageant that selects Cuba's official representative for Miss Universe—one of the Big Four international beauty pageants.

== History ==
The Miss Cuba was held for the first time in 1952 and the winner competed at the Miss Universe pageant. After 1967 Cuban stopped participating at Miss Universe. In 1956 Cuba made its debut at the Miss World pageant. After 1975 Cuban representatives at Miss World did not compete. In 2007 Cuba made its debut at the Miss Earth pageant in Manila, Philippines. In 2009 Cuba competed for the first time at Miss International in Japan. Cuba has been represented in the Big Four international beauty pageants, the four major international as well as other international beauty pageants for women. These are Miss World, Miss Universe, Miss International and Miss Earth.

=== Directorship at Miss Universe ===
- Miguel Sordo and Consuelo Orta (1952)
- Estrella del Carnaval and TV Cuba. FMC and CDR (1959)
- Julio César Cruz (2024 - present)

== Titleholders ==
In 1952–1967 Cuba participated at the Miss Universe pageant. The winner of Miss Cuba competed at the pageant. Since 1968, Cuba stopped competing because of the financial crisis and political issues. This pageant was the official event for Cuban women to be ambassadors of Cuba on the international stage. Between 1952–1975, Cuba had already competed at the Miss Universe and Miss World pageants.

Year	Miss Cuba
1927	Angelina Anduiza
1928	Nila Garrido
1929	Elvira Moreno
1930	Mercedes Loynaz Perdomo
1952	Gladys López
1954	Isis Finlay
1955	Gilda Marín
1956	Marcia Rodríguez
1957	Maria Rosa Gamio
1958	Arminia Pérez
1959	Irma Buesa Mas
1960	Flora Laughten Hoyos
1961	Marta García Vieta
1962	Aurora Prieto
1963	Alicia Margit Chia
1965	Alina De Varona
1966	Lesbia Murrieta
1967	Elina Salavarría
1975	Maricela Maxie Clark
2024	Marianela Ancheta
2025	Lina Luaces
2026	Mia Dio

== International placements ==
=== Miss Universe Cuba ===
Color key

- : Declared as Winner
- : Ended as runner-up
- : Ended as one of the finalists or semi-finalists
- : Ended as Special awards winner

Year	Province represented	Miss Universe Cuba	Placement at Miss Universe	Special awards	Notes
Miss Universe Cuba directorship — a franchise holder to Miss Universe from 2024
Competing since 2024: With the acquiring of the Miss Universe organization by the Thailand-based JKN Global Group and the Mexican-based Legacy Holding Group, the participation of Cuba was resumed, as it is no longer restricted by the United States embargo against Cuba, which prevented the former U.S.-based Miss Universe organization from conducting relations with Cuba. The Miss Universe Cuba pageant is held in Miami, Florida.
2026	Isla de la Juventud	Mia Dio	TBA		
2025	Santiago de Cuba	Lina Luaces	Top 12		
2024	Villa Clara	Marianela Ancheta	Top 30		
Estrella del Carnaval and TV Cuba. FMC and CDR directorship — a franchise holder to Miss Universe from 1959—1967
Did not compete between 1968—2023: The United States embargo against Cuba prevents U.S. businesses, businesses organized under U.S. law or majority-owned by U.S. citizens, from conducting economic relations with Cuban interests, including trade, travel, and financial transactions. As a U.S. business, the Miss Universe organization was restricted from allowing the participation of Cuba. From 1961 to 1967, the Miss Universe franchise in Cuba was named "Cuba Free", and it was held in Miami.
1967	Villa Clara	Elina Salabarría	Unplaced		
1966	Artemisa	Lesbia Murrieta	Unplaced		
1965	La Habana	Alina De Varona	Unplaced		
Did not compete in 1964
1963	La Habana	Alicia Margit Chia	Unplaced		
1962	La Habana	Aurora Prieto	Unplaced		
1961	La Habana	Marta García Vieta	Unplaced		
1960	La Habana	Flora Laughten Hoyos	Unplaced		
1959	La Habana	Irma Buesa Mas	Unplaced		
Miguel Sordo and Consuelo Orta directorship — a franchise holder to Miss Universe from 1952—1958
1958	La Habana	Arminia Pérez y González	Unplaced		
1957	La Habana	Maria Rosa Gamio Fernández	3rd Runner-up		
1956	Cienfuegos	Marcia Rodríguez Echevarría	Top 15		
1955	La Habana	Gilda Marín	Unplaced		
1954	La Habana	Isis Margarita Finlay García	Unplaced		
Did not compete in 1953
1952	Santiago de Cuba	Gladys López	Unplaced		

=== Miss World Cuba ===
- : Declared as Winner
- : Ended as runner-up or top 5/6 qualification
- : Ended as one of the finalists or semifinalists
- : Ended as special awards winner

Year	Province represented	Miss World Cuba	Placement at Miss World	Special awards	Notes
Did not compete since 1976—Present
1975	Havana	Maricela Maxie Clark	3rd Runner-up		
Did not compete between 1956—1974
1955	Havana	Gilda Marín	3rd Runner-up		

=== Miss International Cuba ===
- : Declared as Winner
- : Ended as runner-up or top 5/6 qualification
- : Ended as one of the finalists or semifinalists
- : Ended as special awards winner

Year	Province represented	Miss International Cuba	Placement at Miss International	Special awards	Notes
2026	Havana	Rachel Chang	TBA		
2025	Havana	Rosangela Rizo	Unplaced		
2024	Havana	Shelbi Byrnes Garcia	Top 20		
2023	Artemisa	Sheyla Ravelo	Unplaced		
2022	Havana	Rachel Martín	Unplaced		
Due to the impact of COVID-19 pandemic, no pageant between 2020 and 2021
2019	Havana	Lia Neta Alvarez	Did not compete		
2018	Havana	Jennifer Alvarez Ruiz	Unplaced		
2017	Havana	Claudia Moras Baez	Did not compete		
2016	Havana	Daniela Quesada	Unplaced		
2015	Havana	Heidy Fass	Unplaced		
2014	Havana	Adisleydi Alonso Rodríguez	Unplaced		
2013	Havana	Claudia Valdes	Did not compete		
2012	Havana	Damaris Aguiar	Did not compete		
2011	Texas	Elizabeth Robaina	Unplaced		
2010	Havana	Giselle Capdvila	Did not compete		
2009	Granma	Patricia Rosales	Top 15		

=== Miss Earth Cuba ===
- : Declared as Winner
- : Ended as runner-up or top 5/6 qualification
- : Ended as one of the finalists or semifinalists
- : Ended as special awards winner

Year	Province represented	Miss Earth Cuba	Placement at Miss Earth	Special awards	Notes
2026	Villa Clara	Adrianna Carrandi	TBA		
2025	Havana	Rachel Chang	Unplaced	Best in Evening Gown; Green Leaders in Action Award (Silver Medal); Best in Resort Wear (Fire Group); Miss Eco Tourism 4th runner-up (Fire Group)	
2024	Isla de la Juventud	Stephany Díaz	Top 20	Best Appearance Award (Americas); Best Upcycle Award (Fire Group)	
2023	Villa Clara	Aleida Josefa Perez	Unplaced		
2022	Artemisa	Sheyla Ravelo	Top 12	(gold) Long Gown Competition (Fire Group); (gold) Talent Competition (Fire Group); (silver) Beach Wear Competition (Fire Group); (silver) Swimsuit Competition (Americas); Miss Isla de Romblon 2022 (Fire Group)	
2021	Holguín	Cynthia Linnet Lau	Unplaced		
Did not compete in 2020 due to COVID-19
2019	Havana	Jessica Maria Reyes	Did not compete		
2018	Camagüey	Mónica Aguilar	Unplaced		
Did not compete between 2010—2017
2009	Havana	Jamillette Gaxiola	Unplaced		
2008	Camagüey	Jessica Silva	Unplaced		
2007	Connecticut	Ariana Barouk	Unplaced	Miss Eco - Tourism	

=== Miss Supranational Cuba ===
- : Declared as Winner
- : Ended as runner-up or top 5/6 qualification
- : Ended as one of the finalists or semifinalists
- : Ended as special awards winner

Year	Province represented	Miss Supranational Cuba	Placement at Miss Supranational	Special awards	Notes
2026	Havana	Lianeth Aguilera	Unplaced		
2025	Havana	Freddra Reyes	Unplaced		
2024	Camagüey	María José Cetina	Unplaced		
2023	Camagüey	Monica Aguilar	Unplaced (25th)	Miss Talent (Top 29)	
2022	Camagüey	Liz Rodríguez	Unplaced		
Did not compete between 2013—2021
2012	Havana	Damaris Yamila Aguiar Gómez	Unplaced	Best National Costume	

=== Miss Grand Cuba ===
- : Declared as Winner
- : Ended as runner-up or top 5/6 qualification
- : Ended as one of the finalists or semifinalists
- : Ended as special awards winner

Year	Province	Miss Grand Cuba	Placement at Miss Grand International	Special awards	Notes
2024	Havana	Lourdes Feliu	Unplaced		
2023	Florida	Sofía Acosta	Unplaced		
2022	Camagüey	Daniela Espinosa	Did not compete		
2022	Florida	Fabien Laurencio	Unplaced		
2021	Havana	Geysel Vaillant	Unplaced		
2020	Cienfuegos	Jennifer Sanchez Aguilar	Unplaced		
2020	Havana	Geysel Vailant	Did not compete		
2019	La Habana	Elaine González	Unplaced		
2018	Havana	Gladys Carredeguas	Top 20		
2017	California	Rachel Vazquez	Did not compete		
2017	California	Yvette Blaess	Did not compete		
2017	Havana	Lisandra Delgado	Unplaced		
2016	Las Tunas	Merys Navarro	Top 20		
2015	Havana	María Elena Manzo	Unplaced		
2014	Havana	Daryanne Lees	Miss Grand International 2014	Best in Swimsuit (Top 25)	
2013	Havana	Jamillette Gaxiola	Top 10	Best National Costume (Top 20)	

=== Miss Intercontinental Cuba ===
Color key

- : Declared as Winner
- : Ended as runner-up
- : Ended as one of the finalists or semi-finalists
- : Ended as Special awards winner

Year	Province represented	Miss Intercontinental Cuba	Placement at Miss Intercontinental	Special awards	Notes
2024	Havana	Rosangela Rizo	Top 22		
2023	Matanzas	Stephanie Müller	Top 22		
2022	Havana	Lourdes Feliu	Top 20		
2021	Havana	Yeniffer Pileta Marín	Top 20		
Due to the impact of COVID-19 pandemic, no pageant in 2020
Did not compete in 2019
2018	Holguin	Cynthia Linnet Lau	Unplaced		
Did not compete between 2015—2017
2014	Florida	Jeslie Mergal	1st Runner-Up	Miss Intercontinental North America; 1st Runner-Up – Best in Swimsuit	
2013	Florida	Brianna Suzanne Ortiz	Unplaced		
Did not compete between 2012
2011	Cienfuegos	Damaris Aguair	Top 15		
2010	Havana	Viglis Viquillón	Unplaced		
Did not compete between 2004—2009
2003	Havana	Ariana María Barouk	Unplaced		

== See also ==
- Miss and Mister Supranational Cuba
- Miss Grand Cuba
