= Miss Grand International 2015 =

3rd Miss Grand International Competition, beauty pageant edition

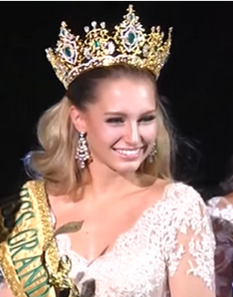
- Claire Elizabeth Parker, assumed winner
- Date: 25 October 2015
- Presenters: Matthew Deane; Daryanne Lees
- Venue: Indoor Stadium Huamark, Bangkok, Thailand
- Broadcaster: Facebook live; Channel 7
- Entrants: 77
- Placements: 20
- Debuts: Angola; Belarus; Bulgaria; Denmark; Ghana; Guyana; Scotland; South Africa; Tonga; Tunisia
- Withdrawals: Argentina; Bosnia and Herzegovina; Botswana; Cameroon; Chile; Côte d'Ivoire; Curaçao; Ecuador; Finland; Germany; Greece; Guam; Kazakhstan; Kosovo; Kurdistan; Lebanon; Luxembourg; Mauritius; New Zealand; Nicaragua; Pakistan; Paraguay; Russia; Saint Vincent and the Grenadines; Samoa; Tahiti; Tanzania; United Kingdom; Zimbabwe
- Returns: Egypt; England; Guatemala; Honduras; Italy; Kenya; Macedonia; Moldova; Namibia; Uganda; Wales
- Winner: Claire Elizabeth Parker; Australia
- Best National Costume: Parul Shah; Philippines

External videos
- Miss Grand International 2015 Grand final competition, on 25 October 2015, Youtube Video

Miss Grand International 2015 was the third edition of the Miss Grand International pageant, held on 25 October 2015 at the Indoor Stadium Huamark in Bangkok, Thailand. Candidates from seventy-seven countries and territories competed for the title, of whom a 20-year-old Dominican American from Rhode Island representing Dominican Republic, Anea García, was announced as the winner and received a cash prize of 40,000 USD as a reward. Meanwhile, the candidates from Miss Grand Australia, Miss Grand India, the Miss Grand Philippines, and Miss Grand Thailand were named the runners-up. However, due to the inability to fulfill the agreement, the original winner from the Dominican Republic was later replaced by the first runner-up, Claire Elizabeth Parker of Australia, in early 2016.

The pageant's grand final round was broadcast via the Channel 7 and the pageant official website, with a Thai television personality, Matthew Deane and Miss Grand International 2014 Lees García, as the event's MCs.

Initially, ninety-one contestants confirmed their participation, but only eighty-five candidates literally entered the tournament. However, some of the entering candidates later withdrew during the pageant camp, such as the representatives of Kurdistan and Russia.

== Background ==
=== Date and venue ===
In the press conference of the national pageant Miss Grand Thailand 2015 held at the Central World Ratchaprasong on 23 March 2015, in addition to releasing the national pageant details, the pageant president Nawat Itsaragrisil also stated that the third edition of Miss Grand International was scheduled for 25 October 2015, at the Indoor Stadium Huamark, Bangkok, Thailand. The international pageant schedule was later revealed at the press release held after the arriving of the contestants on 7 October 2015, at Eden 1 Park, Central World Ratchaprasong.

As in its previous two editions, the pageant consisted of four main events organized in three different cities from October 8–25, including the swimsuit competition held on 11 October at the Kacha Resort, Ko Chang, Trat province; the national costume contest held on 17 October at the King Rama II Memorial Park, Samut Songkhram Province; and the preliminary and final rounds in Bangkok at the Indoor Stadium Huamark on 23 and 25 October.

=== Selection of participants ===
Of all seventy-seven participating delegates, only ten were elected through the Miss Grand national pageants, including the representatives of Albania, Cambodia, England, Japan, Namibia, Nigeria, Scotland, South Africa, Thailand, and Wales, while another candidate who was also elected through the Miss Grand national contest, Dardanie Thaqi of Kosovo, did not enter the international pageant for undisclosed reasons. Three countries send their main other national pageant winners to participate, including Shadi Osmani from Miss Iran, Sarah Mercieca from Miss Malta, and Aracely Azar from Rostro de México.

The remaining candidates were either appointed without participating in national pageants or being runners-up in the other 2015 national pageants, such as Vartika Singh of India who was named Miss Grand India after finishing as the second runner-up in Femina Miss India 2015.

Jihan Dimack of Tanzania withdrew from the competition.

== Results ==
=== Placements ===
Placement	Contestant
Miss Grand International 2015	Dominican Republic – Anea García (Dethroned)
1st runner-up	Australia – Claire Elizabeth Parker (Assumed)
2nd runner-up	India – Vartika Singh
3rd runner-up	Philippines – Parul Shah
4th runner-up	Costa Rica – Mariela Aparicio (Assumed)
Top 10	Brazil – Paula Gomes; Japan – Ayaka Tanaka; Spain – Andrea de Cozar; Sri Lanka – Ornella Gunesekere §; Puerto Rico – Isamar de Jesús (Assumed)
Top 20	Angola – Meriam Kaxuxwena; Czech Republic – Taťána Makarenko; France – Eline Lamboley; Mexico – Aracely Azar; Netherlands – Shauny Bult; Poland – Katarzyna Krzeszowska; Ukraine – Anastasiia Lenna; United States – Lauren Petersen; Venezuela – Reina Rojas

§ – Voted into the Top 10 by viewers and awarded as Miss Popular Vote

=== Special awards ===
Awards	Contestant
Best National Costume	Philippines – Parul Shah
Best Evening Gown	Japan – Ayaka Tanaka
Best in Swimsuit	Costa Rica – Mariela Aparicio
Best in Social Media	India – Vartika Singh
Miss Popular Vote	Sri Lanka – Ornella Gunesekere

== Pageant ==
=== Format ===
In the pageant grand final round held on 7 October, after an introduction section, twenty contestants, who were selected through the preliminary round held on 5 October as well as all pre-pageant scorings, qualified for the top 20, in which each of the qualified candidates competed in the swimsuit. The score from this round, together with all previous accumulation scores, determined the top 10 finalists who then competed against each other in the evening gown and speech session. Based on accumulation scores, the final five were selected to continue in the question and answer portion, where the winner and runners-up were determined.

== Contestants ==
77 contestants competed for the title.

Country/Territory	Delegate	Age	Hometown
Albania	Enkelejda Lajci	17	Tirana
Angola	Meriam Kaxuxwena	22	Luanda
Australia	Claire Elizabeth Parker	23	Sydney
Belarus	Luliia Kuper	19	Minsk
Belgium	Rana Özkaya	18	Limburg
Bolivia	Adriana Delgadillo	24	Sucre
Brazil	Paula Gomes	23	Campo Grande
Bulgaria	Veneta Krasteva	23	Sofia
Cambodia	Polvithavy Seng	23	Phnom Penh
Canada	Jade Caron	23	Toronto
China	Huili Xie	23	Henan
Colombia	Gisella Correa	24	Chocó
Costa Rica	Mariela Aparicio	27	San José
Cuba	María Manzo	23	Havana
Czech Republic	Taťána Makarenko	25	Prague
Denmark	Isabella Christensen	17	Herning
Dominican Republic	Anea García	20	Cranston
Egypt	Cherine Shiba	20	Cairo
England	Elizabeth Greenham	22	Wallasey
Estonia	Anna Liisa Virkus	24	Tallinn
Ethiopia	Bethelhem Belay	21	Addis Ababa
France	Eline Lamboley	18	Paris
Ghana	Charlee Berbicks	21	Accra
Guatemala	Analí Calderón	26	San Pedro Sacatepéquez
Guyana	Soyini Fraser	25	Georgetown
Haiti	Marie Darline Exumé	24	Port-au-Prince
Honduras	Nadia Morales	18	Colón
Hong Kong	Janet Choi	26	Victoria
Hungary	Szabó Csillag	20	Pest
India	Vartika Singh	23	Lucknow
Indonesia	Yolanda Remetwa	21	Malang
Iran	Shadi Osmani	26	Tabriz
Israel	Karin Nakash	27	Beit Dagan
Italy	Maria Murazzani	23	Oristano
Japan	Ayaka Tanaka	25	Saitama
Kenya	Elaine Mwangi	22	Nairobi
Macau	Chloe Lan	23	Macau
(North Macedonia) Macedonia	Dunavka Trifunovska	34	Skopje
Malaysia	Santhawan Boonratana	23	Kelantan
Malta	Sarah Marcieca	24	Balzan
Mexico	Aracely Azar	25	Campeche
Moldova	Bianca Mihalache	19	Chișinău
Mongolia	Khaliunaa Munkhsoyol	21	Ulaanbaatar
Myanmar	San Htate Htar Linn	21	Yangon
Namibia	Unongo Kutako	23	Okakarara
Nepal	Jenita Basnet	27	Kathmandu
Netherlands	Shauny Bult	23	Boxtel
Nigeria	Ifeoma Ohia	22	Lagos
Norway	Sonia Singh	23	Oslo
Panama	María Suárez	24	Chiriquí
Peru	Alejandra Almonte	20	Ucayali
Philippines	Parul Shah	26	San Nicolas
Poland	Katarzyna Krzeszowska	25	Krynica-Zdrój
Portugal	Inês Filipa Gigante	23	Lisbon
Puerto Rico	Isamar de Jesús	18	Bayamón
Romania	Georgiana Radu	22	Bucharest
Scotland	Taylor Stringfellow	23	Glasgow
Singapore	Rouzi Yan	25	Singapore
Slovakia	Andrea Barthalosová	21	Lučenec
South Africa	Lenie Pieterse	22	Johannesburg
South Korea	Dasol Lee	25	Seoul
South Sudan	Akan William	22	Juba
Spain	Andrea de Cozar	21	Málaga
Sri Lanka	Ornella Gunesekere	23	Kirulapana
Suriname	Svetoisckia Brunswijk	18	Paramaribo
Sweden	Issabella Georgsson	22	Uppsala
Taiwan	Viky Lin	25	Taipei
Thailand	Rattikorn Kunsom	22	Hat Yai
Tonga	Sicilia Makisi	22	Nukualofa
Tunisia	Arij Nasri	22	Téboursouk
Uganda	Lilian Gashumba	26	Kawaala
Ukraine	Anastasiia Lenna	24	Kyiv
United States	Lauren Petersen	24	Missouri
United States Virgin Islands	Petra Cabrera	21	Charlotte Amalie
Venezuela	Reina Rojas	22	Caracas
Vietnam	Lệ Quyên Nguyễn	22	Bạc Liêu
Wales	Danielle Latimer	26	Barry
