= Miss Grand Cuba 2025 =

2nd Miss Grand Cuba competition

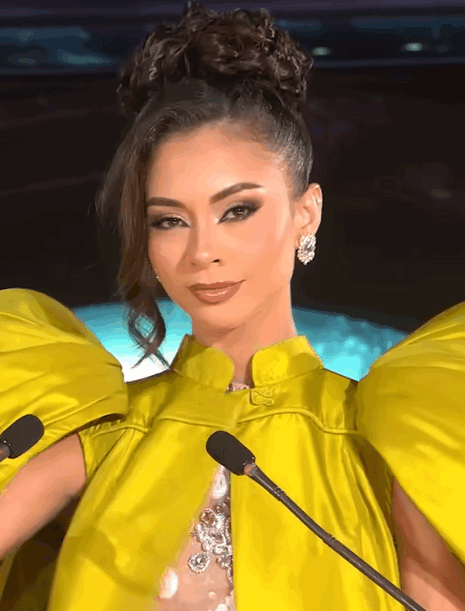
- Daylin Rodríguez, the winner of the contest
- Date: 28 March 2025
- Presenters: Luciana Fuster
- Venue: Mayu restaurant, Miami, Florida, United States
- Broadcaster: YouTube
- Entrants: 10
- Placements: 6
- Winner: Dailyn Rodriguez (Isla de la Juventud)
- Miss Popular Vote: Laura Cruz (La Habana)

External videos
- Grand final competition

Miss Grand Cuba 2025 was the second Miss Grand Cuba pageant, held at the Mayu restaurant in Miami, Florida, United States, on 28 March 2025. Ten contestants competed for the title.

The contest was won by Dailyn Rodriguez of Isla de la Juventud, who was crowned by the preceding Miss Grand Cuba 2024, Lourdes Feliu. Dailyn will represent the country at the international parent stage, Miss Grand International 2025, to be held on 18 October 2025 in Thailand.

The event was hosted by Miss Grand International 2023 Luciana Fuster of Peru. This edition was also the first Miss Grand Cuba contest organized by Cristian Aguiar, a model coordinator who took over the license from Daryanne Lees in 2024.

== Competition ==
The competition officially ran on 15 March 2025, the welcome dinner and sashing ceremony day. The swimsuit round then on 17 March and the final round on 28 March. In parallel, the pageant website also conducted a pay-to-vote challenge called Miss Popular Vote, with the winner automatically securing a spot in the top 6 finalists in the grand final round.

The panel of judges in the grand finals include:

- Janelee Chaparro – Miss Grand International 2013
- Lees Garcia - Miss Grand International 2014
- Sthephanie Miranda – Miss Grand United States 2023
- Maria Felix – Miss Grand Dominican Republic 2024
- Philippe Obrrgon – Choreographer
- Jesus Hernandez – Beauty pageant expert

== Result ==
Miss Grand Cuba 2025 competition results by province
Color key:
Winner	1st RU
2nd RU	Top 6
Unplaced	Did not compete

Position	Contestant
Winner	Isla de la Juventud – Dailyn Rodriguez
1st runner-up	Villa Clara – Laura Perez
2nd runner-up	Matanzas – Yisel Yero
Top 6	Cienfuegos – Yarisel Urra; La Habana – Laura Cruz (Note: Automatically qualified for the top 6 finalists after winning the Miss Popular Vote fast track.); Santiago de Cuba – Mia Davalos
Special awards
Best in Swimsuit	Villa Clara – Laura Perez
Best Evening Gown	Isla de la Juventud – Dailyn Rodriguez
Miss Popular Vote	La Habana – Laura Cruz

== Contestants ==
Ten contestants qualified for the national finals through the profile screening. Each was later assigned to represent one of the 15 provinces of Cuba.

Province	Contestant	Hometown
Ciego de Ávila	Jennifer Seijas	West Palm Beach
Cienfuegos	Yarisel Urra	Atlanta
Holguín	Lizbet Vázquez	Miami
Isla de la Juventud	Dailyn Rodriguez	Miami
La Habana	Laura Cruz	Delray Beach
Matanzas	Yisel Yero	Port St. Lucie
Pinar del Río	Rosmeri Diaz	Panama City Beach
Santiago de Cuba	Mia Davalos	Miami
Trinidad (SS)	Mila Molina	Miami
Villa Clara	Laura Perez	West Palm Beach
—N/a	Jennifer Gueje (Note: Withdrawn candidates)	Miami
—N/a	Sisily Marín	Los Angeles
