= Miss Grand Cuba =

Beauty pageant in the United States

- Formation: 20 August 2023; 3 years ago
- Founder: Daryanne Lees
- Type: Beauty pageant
- Headquarters: Miami, Florida
- Location: United States
- Members: Miss Grand International
- Official language: English; Spanish
- National director: Cristian Aguiar
- Website: MissGrandCuba.com

Miss Grand Cuba
licensees timeline

Stand-alone pageant
Under another pageant
Appointed titleholder

Miss Grand Cuba is a national title given to a woman chosen to represent Cuba at the Miss Grand International pageant. The first titleholder was a Mexican-Cuban model from Sinaloa, Jamillette Gaxiola, who was appointed by the Miss Cuba organization to compete at the inaugural edition of the mentioned international contest in Thailand, where she was ranked in the final 10. Since then, Cuba has always sent their representatives to compete every year; however, most of them were appointed to the position without organizing the respective pageant until 2022, when a Miami-based Cuban pageant, Miss y Mister Cuba, acquired the license and the Miss Grand Cuba titleholder was elected through such a contest.

The first stand-alone contest of Miss Grand Cuba happened in mid-2023 in Tampa, Florida, organized by former Miss Grand International 2014, Daryanne Lees, after she took over the franchise from the Miss y Mister Cuba organization,

== History ==
Cuba has usually been sending their representatives to compete at the Miss Grand International since 2013, and won the contest once in 2014 by a Cuban-Puerto Rican, Daryanne Lees, who later became the director of the Miss Grand Cuba pageant in 2023. From 2013 to 2020, the license belonged to a Miami-based pageant organizer chaired by Noemi Meléndez, Miss Cuba. However, no national contests were organized for Miss Grand International; Cuban representatives for the mentioned period were all appointed.

In 2021, the license was taken over by another group of Cuban Americans, Vicar Abel and Miledy de los Santos, and was then transferred to Julio César Cruz and Faddya Halabi in 2022, when Miss Grand Cuba was one of the main titles in their national pageant, Miss y Mister Cuba. However, Daryanne Lees, with a former licensee, Noemi Meléndez, as chief financial officer, took the license back in 2023 and organized the first contest of Miss Grand Cuba in Tampa, Florida, in mid-2023, to select the country representative for the 2023 edition of Miss Grand International. The license was then transferred to a Florida-based Cuban photographer, Cristian Aguiar, the following year.

== Editions ==
=== Location and date ===
The following are the details of the Miss Grand Cuba pageant, which was held as a stand-alone competition twice in 2023 and 2025.

Edition	Date	Final venue	Entrants	Ref.
1st	20 August 2023	Tampa Marriott Westshore, Tampa, Florida, United States	5	
2nd	28 March 2025	Mayu restaurant, Miami, Florida, United States	10	

=== Competition result ===
Edition	Winner	Runners-up		Ref.
Edition	Winner	First	Second	Ref.
1st	Sofia Acosta (Miami)	Lourdes Feliu (Miami)	Maria Karla Vilches (Miami)	
2nd	Dailyn Rodriguez (Isla de la Juventud)	Laura Perez (Villa Clara)	Yisel Yero (Matanzas)	

== International competition ==
The following is a list of Cuban representatives at the Miss Grand International contest.

Color keys

- : Declared as the winner
- : Ended as a runner-up (Top 5)
- : Ended as a finalist (Top 10)
- : Ended as a semifinalist (Top 20/21)
- : Ended as special awards winner

Year	Miss Grand Cuba	National title	Placement	Special Awards	National Director
2026	Alyanni Gómez	Reina Hispanoamericana Cuba 2022	5th Runner-up		Cristian Aguiar
2025	Daylin Rodriguez	Miss Grand Cuba 2025	Unplaced		Cristian Aguiar
2024	Lourdes Feliu	1st Runner-up - Miss Grand Cuba 2023	Unplaced		Cristian Aguiar
2023	Sofia Acosta	Miss Grand Cuba 2023	Unplaced		Daryanne Lees
2022	Daniela Espinosa	Miss Grand Cuba 2022 (Note: Main title of the Miss y Mister Cuba 2022 pageant)	Resigned		Julio César Cruz & Faddya Halabi
2022	Fabién Laurencio	1st Runner-up - Nuestra Belleza Latina 2021	Unplaced		Julio César Cruz & Faddya Halabi
2021	Geysel Valliant	Appointed	Unplaced		Vicar Abel & Miledy de los Santos
2020	Jennifer Sánchez	Appointed	Unplaced		Noemi Meléndez
2020	Geysel Vailant	Appointed	Resigned		Noemi Meléndez
2019	Elaine González	Appointed	Unplaced		Noemi Meléndez
2018	Gladys Carredeguas	Appointed	Top 20	Best in Swimsuit	Noemi Meléndez
2017	Lisandra Delgado	Appointed	Unplaced		Noemi Meléndez
2017	Yvette Blaess	Finalist - Miss World America 2016	Resigned		Noemi Meléndez
2017	Rachel Vazquez	Appointed	Resigned		Noemi Meléndez
2016	Merys Navarro	Appointed	Top 20		Noemi Meléndez
2015	María Manzo	Appointed	Unplaced		Noemi Meléndez
2014	Daryanne Lees	1st Runner-up - Miss Earth USA 2014	Winner		Noemi Meléndez
2013	Jamillette Gaxiola	2nd Runner-up - Senorita Republica Deportiva	Top 10		Noemi Meléndez

== Participating national finalists ==
The following list is the national finalists of the Miss Grand Cuba pageant, as well as the competition results.

Represented	1st	2nd
Ciego de Ávila	No Province title	Y
Cienfuegos	No Province title	6
Holguín	No Province title	Y
Isla de la Juventud	No Province title	
La Habana	No Province title	6
Matanzas	No Province title	
Pinar del Río	No Province title	Y
Santiago de Cuba	No Province title	6
Trinidad	No Province title	Y
Villa Clara	No Province title	
Total	5	10
Color keys: : Declared as the winner; : Ended as a 1st runner-up; : Ended as a 2nd runner-up; : Ended as a 3rd runner-up; : Ended as a 4th runner-up; A : Ended as a finalist, semifinalist (N) and unplaced (Y); × : Ended as withdrew during the competition; × : Ended as no representative

== Winner Gallery ==
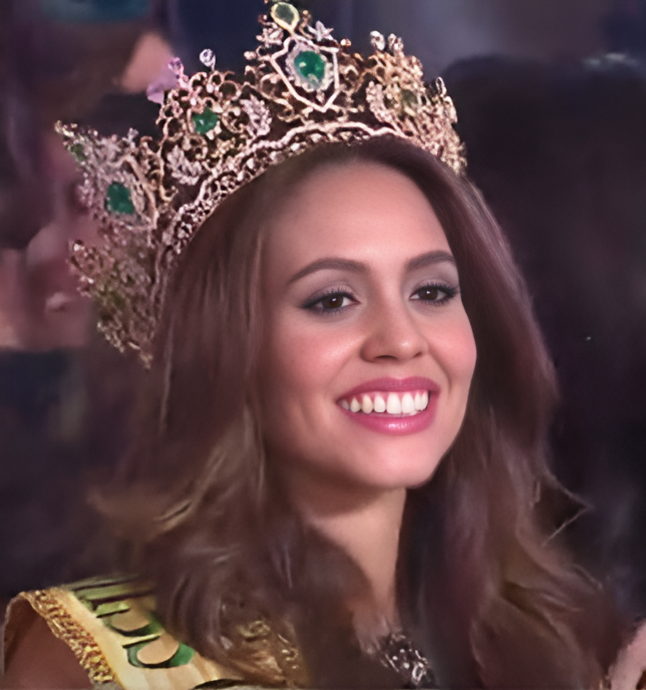
Miss Grand Cuba 2014
Daryanne Lees

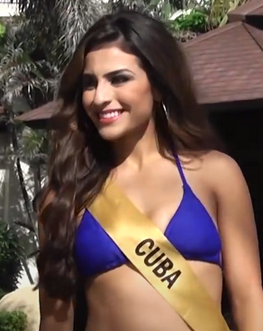
Miss Grand Cuba 2015
María Manzo

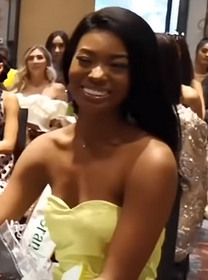
Miss Grand Cuba 2021
Geysel Vailant

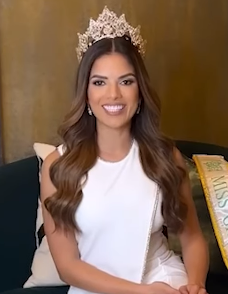
Miss Grand Cuba 2023
Sofía Acosta

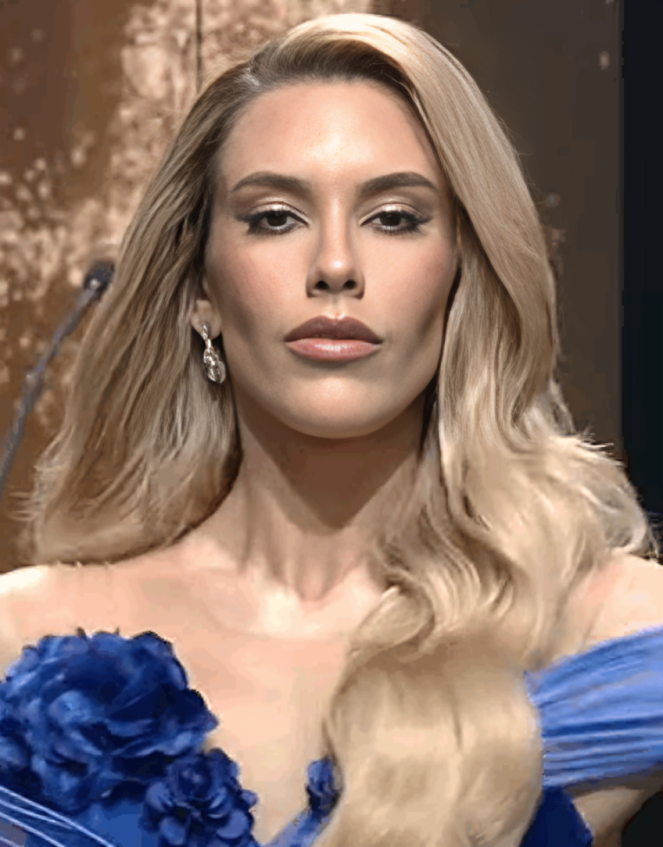
Miss Grand Cuba 2024
Lourdes Feliu

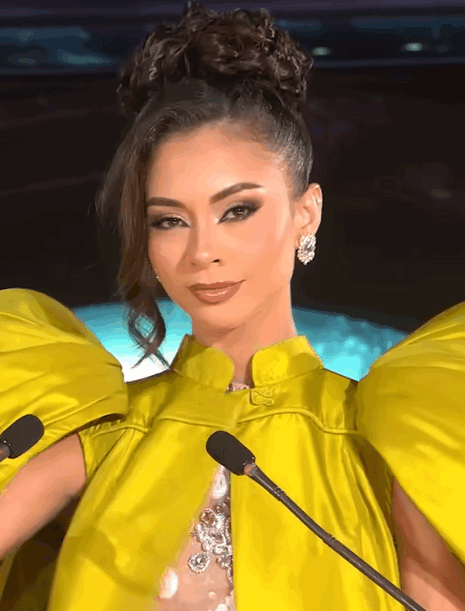
Miss Grand Cuba 2025
Daylin Rodríguez

Miss Grand Cuba 2026
Alyanni Gomez
