= Miss Grand Cuba 2023 =

1st Miss Grand Cuba competition, beauty pageant edition

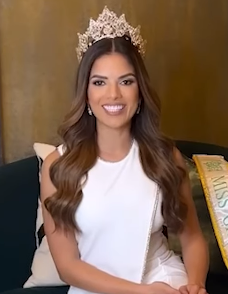
- Sofía Acosta, the winner of the contest
- Date: 20 August 2023
- Presenters: Andy Salandy
- Venue: Tampa Marriott Westshore, Tampa, Florida, United States
- Broadcaster: YouTube
- Entrants: 5
- Placements: 5
- Miss Grand Cuba 2023: Sofia Acosta (Miami)
- Miss International Cuba 2023: Sheyla Ravelo (San Antonio de los Baños)

Miss Grand Cuba 2023 was the inaugural edition of the Miss Grand Cuba pageant, held on 20 August 2023, at the Tampa Marriott Westshore, Tampa, Florida, United States. Five candidates, who qualified for the national final round through an audition held in mid-2023, competed for the title, of whom a 26-year-old Portuguese-Cuban model and assistant project manager from Miami-Dade County, Sofia Acosta, was announced the winner, while a Cuban national coordinator for the UN Ocean Decade ECOP program, Sheyla Ravelo, won the supplementary title of Miss International Cuba 2023.

Sofia later represented the country at the international parent stage, Miss Grand International 2023, held in Vietnam on 25 October, while Sheyla traveled to Japan to compete at Miss International 2023, held on 26 October. However, both of them were unplaced at the mentioned international stages.

The event was managed by former Miss Grand International 2014, Daryanne Lees, and the pageant's grand final round was hosted by Andy Salandy.

The panel of judges included Juan Carlos Collazo, Arisleyda Alonzo, Pedro Herde, Jamillette Gaxiola, Rachel Martin, and Rafa Delfin.

== Result ==
Position	Delegate
Main title
Miss Grand Cuba 2023	03. Sofia Acosta
1st Runner-up	05. Lourdes Feliu
2nd Runner-up	01. Maria Karla Vilches
3rd Runner-up	02. Yamislaidy García
Supplemental title
Miss International Cuba 2023	06. Sheyla Ravelo
Runner-up	01. Maria Karla Vilches

== Candidates ==
Initially, six candidates qualified for the national final, but one of them withdrew, making the finalized total of five candidates.

No.	Contestant	Age	Hometown
01.	Maria Karla Vilches	19	Miami
02.	Yamislaidy García	20	Minnesota
03.	Sofia Acosta	26	Miami
04.	Mía Davalos^{[α]}	20	Miami
05.	Lourdes Feliu	21	Miami
06	Sheyla Ravelo	23	San Antonio de los Baños
Note:^α Withdrawn candidate
