= Nane =

Nane or NANE may refer to:

== Places ==
- Nane, Bulgaria
- Nane, Mawal, Pune district, Maharashtra, India
- Nane District, Luang Prabang Province, Laos

== Other uses ==
- Nane (goddess), an Armenian mother goddess
- Daniela Nane (born 1971), Romanian actress and director
- Joseph Nane (born 1987), Cameroonian footballer
- Nane Germon (1909–2001), French actress
- National Association for Nursery Education
