= Miss Sulaymaniyah =

Rayan Ali
- ڕه‌یان عه‌لی
- Born: Rayan Ali Abdalla; October 13, 1999 (age 26); Sulaymaniyah, Iraq
- Occupation: Miss Iraq
- Years active: 2015–Present
- Known for: Miss Sulaymaniyah
- Title: "Miss Sulaymaniyah 2021"
- Website: https://missrayan.com

Miss Sulaymaniyah is part of an official national beauty pageant of Iraq and the only pageant recognized by the Ministry of Culture of the Republic of Iraq. The contest will be held annually in Baghdad, the capital of Iraq.

Year	Name	Note
2021	Rayan Ali	Miss Kurdistan Candidate 2018

== Rayan Ali - 2021-2022 ==
Rayan Ali Abdalla (Arabic: ریان علی عبدللە; born October 13, 1999) is an Beauty Pageant who won the “Miss Sulaymaniyah 2021” beauty pageant and was a Doctor from southern Kurdistan she was crowned as Miss Sulaymaniyah in 2021, she is one of the candidates for Miss Kurdistan. Rayan is from Sulaymaniyah, She holds a bachelor in veterinary training. Professionals from the University of Sulaymaniyah.
