= Miss Grand Kurdistan =

Iranian beauty pageant title

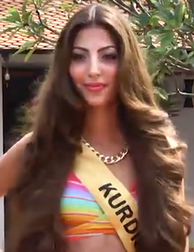
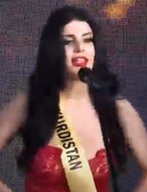
- Dalia Hassan; Miss Grand Kurdistan 2014 Leyli Chupani; Miss Grand Kurdistan 2015
- Formation: 2014
- Dissolved: 2015
- Type: Beauty pageant
- Headquarters: Erbil
- Location: Iraq
- Members: Miss Grand International
- Official language: Kurdish; Arabic
- National director: Dalia Rebwar

Miss Grand Kurdistan is a female beauty pageant title awarded to Kurd representatives competing at the Miss Grand International pageant. The title was first awarded in 2014 to a Swedish-Kurdish, Dalia Rebwar Hassan, who was also a finalist of Miss Kurdistan 2013. Dalia later competed at the Miss Grand International 2014 pageant in Thailand.

Since the establishment of Miss Grand International, Kurdistan participated only twice: in 2014 and 2015; however, its 2015 representative withdrew before completing the tournament, while the remaining was unplaced.

== History ==
Kurdistan debuted in Miss Grand International in 2014 after a finalist in a newly established pageant, Miss Kurdistan, Dalia Rebwar, was assigned to compete internationally in Thailand. Even though Dalia got a non-placement in such a contest, she renewed the license the following year and subsequently assigned a Dubai-based model, Leyli Chupani, as her successor.

During the 2015 international pageant's boot camp in Thailand, Leyli withdrew before reaching the grand final stage and accused the international organizer of not providing enough food as well as bedtime for the contestants, which caused her health to become unstable and led her to withdraw. However, the organizer declared that after the examination in the hospital, the doctor concluded Leyli did not have any instability but she insisted on declaring that she was unwell and desired to retire from the competition.

== International competition ==
The following is a list of Kurd representatives at the Miss Grand International contest.

Year	Representative	Original national title	Competition Performance		National director
Year	Representative	Original national title	Placement	Other award(s)	National director
2014	Dalia Rebwar Hassan	Miss Kurdistan 2013 Finalist	Unplaced	—N/a	Dalia Rebwar
2015	Leyli Chupani	Appointed	Withdrew during the contest		Dalia Rebwar
No representatives since 2016
