= Isis (given name) =

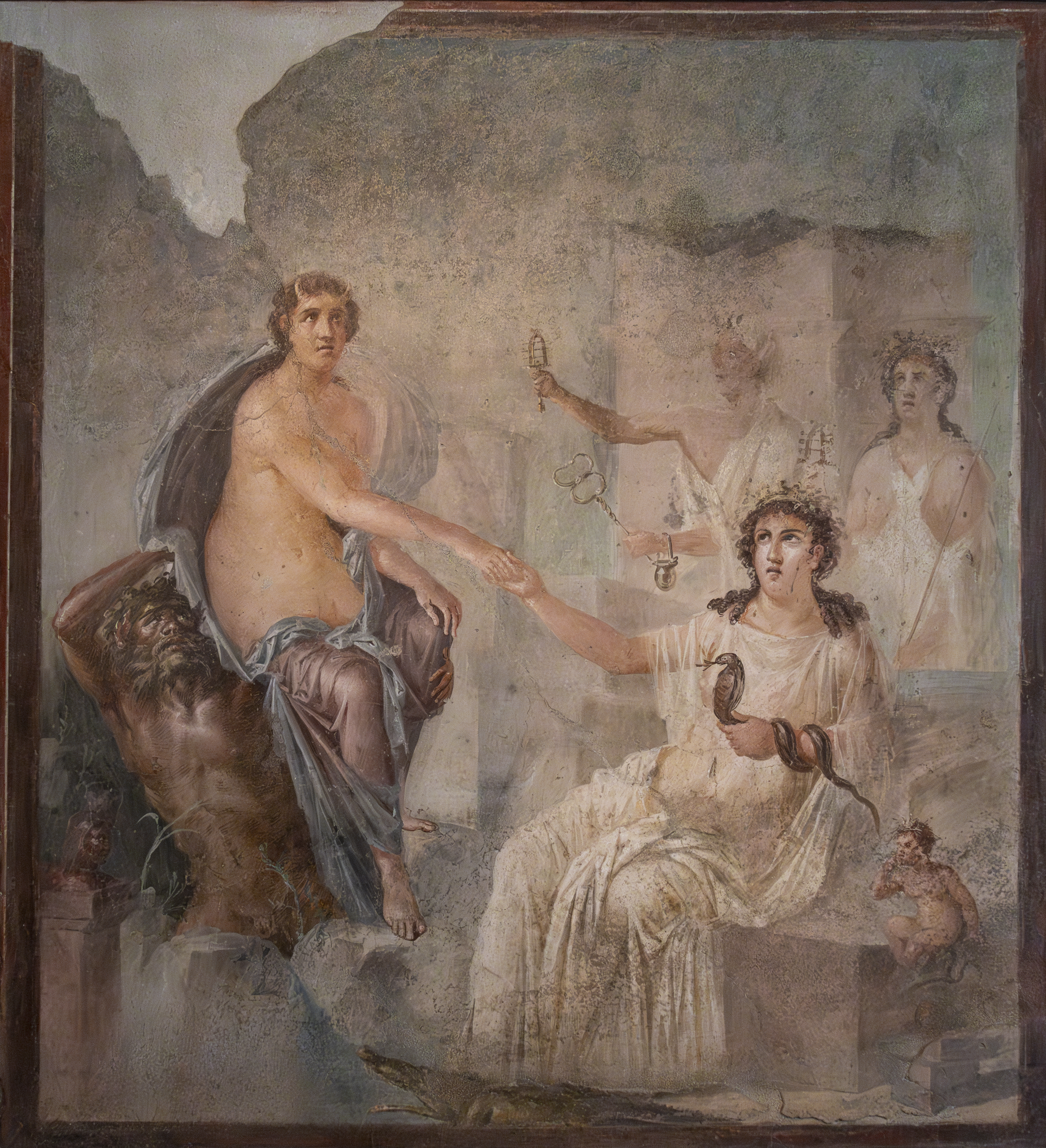
- Isis receives Io, a wall painting from Pompeii.
- Gender: female

Origin
- Origin: Ancient Egypt
- Meaning: name of Ancient Egyptian goddess

Isis is a female first name.

== Meaning ==
The initial popularity of the name derived from its association with the goddess Isis of the Egyptian pantheon.

== Usage ==
Isis ranked among the top 1,000 names for newborn girls in the United States between 1994 and 2014, reaching peak popularity in 2005, when it was the 522nd most popular name for baby girls. The name was among the 1,000 most popular names for newborn girls in England and Wales at different points between 2012 and 2013; among the top 100 most popular names for newborn girls in the Netherlands between 2008 and 2013; and among the top 100 names for newborn girls in Portugal at different points between 2012 and 2018. Since 2014, the name Isis has decreased significantly due to negative associations with the jihadist terrorist organization Islamic State of Iraq and Syria (ISIS)

== Given name ==
- Isis Anchalee (born 1993), Canadian full-stack engineer
- Isis Louise van den Broek (born 2005), Dutch tennis player
- Isis Casalduc (born 1981), Puerto Rican beauty pageant titleholder and model
- Isis Finlay (1934–2007), Cuban model and beauty pageant titleholder
- Isis Gaston (born 2000), American rapper known as Ice Spice
- Isis Giménez (born 1990), Venezuelan fencer
- Isis Gomes (born 1985), Brazilian model
- Isis Hainsworth (born 1998), Scottish actress
- Isis Holt (born 2001), Australian Paralympic athlete
- Isis King (born 1985), American model, actress, and fashion designer
- Isis Avis Loren, Australian drag performer
- Isis Mussenden (born 1959), American costume designer
- Isis Nyong'o, Kenyan-American businesswoman
- Isis Pogson (1852–1945), British astronomer and meteorologist
- Isis Poon (born 1991), Hong Kong-Australian badminton player
- Isis Rodriguez (born 1964), American painter
- Ísis Valverde (born 1987), Brazilian actress

== Surname ==
- María Isis (María Jesús), daughter of Mexican army general Agustín de Iturbide

== Fictional Characters ==
- Isis, name of several female characters in American comic books published by DC Comics
- Isis, a superhero from the comic book created by Angel Gate Press and Image Comics
- Isis, a character part of the Heliopolitans in American comic books published by Marvel Comics
- Isis, a fictional cat owned by supervillainess Catwoman that featured in Batman: The Animated Series and Krypto the Superdog (TV series)
- ISIS-chan, a fictional manga character
