= Miss Ethiopia =

Beauty pageant

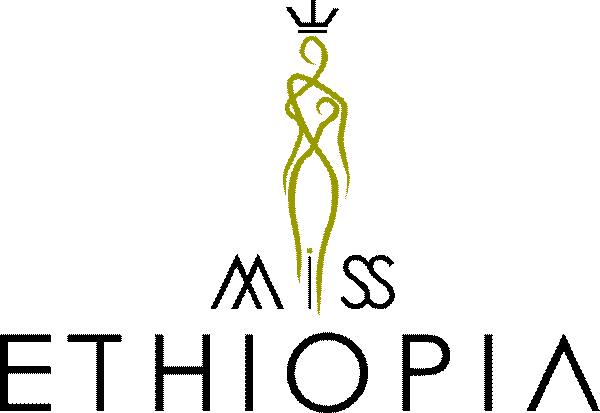
- Logo of the Miss Ethiopia event.
- Formation: 1963
- Type: Beauty pageant
- Headquarters: Addis Ababa
- Location: Ethiopia
- Members: Miss World; Miss International; Miss Supranational; Miss Grand International; Miss Intercontinental
- Official language: Amharic
- Chairman: Murad Mohammed

Miss Ethiopia is a national beauty pageant in Ethiopia.

== History ==
The Miss Ethiopia began in 1963. There were two editions during the period and it finally rerun as the Miss Ethiopia pageant in 1988 under the Ethio American Entertainment Inc. Currently, the Miss Ethiopia pageant is owned by Murad Mohammed.

== Controversies ==
The chairman of Miss Ethiopia, Murad Mohammed, is the director of Ethiopian Village Adventure Playground, which claims ownership of Miss Ethiopia, and has frequently announced that the Miss Ethiopia queens would participate in international pageants like Miss International, Miss Earth, Miss Progress, etc. despite not owning a franchise for the pageants. Much of the judging is not done publicly, so the general population is not able to follow the process from start to finish, or see the final event taking place.

== Lack of transparency ==
The latest version of the pageant is seen to lack transparency, due to the fact that the winner is suddenly announced without a proper contest being held, girls are put in a studio with sashes proclaiming them to be finalist, but the public are not able to follow the process from start to finish, or see the actual final event taking place.

In several years past the runner up has simply been appointed Miss Ethiopia by Murad Mohammed and Ethiopian Village Adventure Playground for the purpose of attending Miss World for example. Melkam Michael Endale who was crowned Miss Ethiopia 2010 for example, who never got her promised car or 100,000 ETBirr, was simply appointed as Miss World Ethiopia in 2012, without taking part in a contest for the purpose of attending Miss World 2012

== Bogus prizes ==
Murad Mohammed, the director of Ethiopian Village Adventure Playground, who claims to be the latest owner of Miss Ethiopia, has been accused of repeatedly advertising bogus prizes for his version of Miss Ethiopia, such as 100,000 Et Birr, US$6250 prize, a house, Modelling contract in New York, participation in several international pageants, awarding of 60,000 Et birr US$3750 Diamond rings, none of which can be verified as having been ever awarded.

== Titleholders ==
| Year | Miss Ethiopia | Notes |
|---|---|---|
| 1963 | Ejigayehu Beyene | |
| 1964 | Misrak Million | |
| 1968 | Wossene Hailu | |
| 1988 | Sehin Belew | Ethio American Entertainment Inc. directorship |
| 2009 | Chuna Okaka | Murad Mohammed directorship |
| 2010 | Melkam Michael Endale | Miss World Ethiopia 2012 |
| 2013 | Genet Tsegay Tesfay | Miss World Ethiopia 2013 |
| 2014 | Nardos Tegegne | |
| 2015 | Kisanet Teklit Teklehaimanot | Miss World Ethiopia 2015 |
| 2018 | Sollyana Abayneh | Miss World Ethiopia 2018 |

== Ethiopia at International pageants ==
=== Miss World Ethiopia ===
- : Declared as Winner
- : Ended as runner-up or top 5/6 qualification
- : Ended as one of the finalists or semifinalists
- : Ended as special awards winner

Began 2003 the new foundation of Miss World Ethiopia (Ethiopian Beauty Queens Organization) took the franchise of Miss World and the winner represents Ethiopia at Miss World pageant.

| Year | Miss Ethiopia | Placement at Miss World | Special Awards | Notes |
|---|---|---|---|---|
| 2026 | Ruth Yirgalem | Unplaced | | |
| 2025 | Hasset Dereje | 1st Runner-Up | Miss World Africa | |
| 2024 | No competition held | | | |
| 2023 | Rgat Afewerki Ybrah | Unplaced | | |
Due to the impact of COVID-19 pandemic, no pageant between 2020—2022
| 2019 | Feven Araya Gebreslassie | Unplaced | | |
| 2018 | Sollyana Abayneh | Unplaced | | |
| 2017 | Kisanet Haile Gbereslasie | Unplaced | | |
| 2016 | Did not compete | | | |
| 2015 | Kisanet Teklit Teklehaimanot | Unplaced | | |
| 2014 | Yirgalem Hadish Adhanom | Unplaced | | |
| 2013 | Genet Tsegay Tesfay | Unplaced | | |
| 2012 | Melkam Michael Endale | Unplaced | | |
| 2011 | Did not compete | | | |
| 2010 | Hiwot Assefa Tesfaye | Unplaced | | |
| 2009 | Lula Gezu Weldegebriel | Unplaced | | |
| 2008 | Hibret Fedaku Alemu | Unplaced | | |
| 2007 | Mihret Abebe | Unplaced | | |
| 2006 | Amleset Muchie | Unplaced | | |
| 2005 | Seble Mekonnen | Unplaced | | |
| 2004 | Sayat Demissie | Unplaced | | |
| 2003 | Hayat Ahmed Mohammed | Top 20 | Miss World Africa | |

=== Miss International Ethiopia ===
- : Declared as Winner
- : Ended as runner-up or top 5/6 qualification
- : Ended as one of the finalists or semifinalists
- : Ended as special awards winner

The second title of Miss World Ethiopia will be Miss International Ethiopia and represents Ethiopia at Miss International pageant.

| Year | Miss Ethiopia | Placement at Miss International | Special Awards | Notes |
|---|---|---|---|---|
| 2024 | Hermela Nigussie | Unplaced | Top 10 – Best National Costume | |
Did not compete between 2019—2023
| 2018 | Frezewd Solomon Demissie | Unplaced | | Runner-up of Miss World Ethiopia 2018 appointed as Miss International Ethiopia 2018. |
| 2017 | Bamlak Dereje Fikru | Unplaced | | |
Did not compete between 2010—2016
| 2009 | Rahel Debebe Woldekirkos | Unplaced | | |
| 2008 | Nardos Desta Tafese | Unplaced | | |
| 2007 | Kidan Tesfahun | Unplaced | | Miss Millenium Queen directorship |
| 2006 | Fethiya Mohammed Seid | Unplaced | | |
| 2005 | Dina Fekadu Mosissa | Unplaced | | Later, represented Ethiopia at Miss Universe 2006 and placed in Top 20. |
| 2004 | Helina Mezegbu | Unplaced | | |
| 2003 | Yodit Getahun | Unplaced | | |

=== Miss Supranational Ethiopia ===
- : Declared as Winner
- : Ended as runner-up or top 5/6 qualification
- : Ended as one of the finalists or semifinalists
- : Ended as special awards winner

Miss Supranational Ethiopia individually held by Miss Supranational Ethiopia Organization. The winner represents Ethiopia at Miss Supranational pageant.

| Year | Miss Ethiopia | Placement at Miss Supranational | Special Awards | Notes |
|---|---|---|---|---|
| 2023 | Did not compete | | | |
Due to the impact of COVID-19 pandemic, no pageant between 2020—2022
| 2019 | Hanna Abate | Unplaced | | |
| 2018 | Did not compete | | | |
| 2017 | Bitaniya Yosef Mohammed | 3rd Runner-up | | |
| 2016 | Misker Kassahun | Unplaced | | |
Did not compete between 2012—2015
| 2011 | Aman Taye Lemma | Unplaced | | |

=== Miss Grand International Ethiopia ===
- : Declared as Winner
- : Ended as runner-up or top 5/6 qualification
- : Ended as one of the finalists or semifinalists
- : Ended as special awards winner

| Year | Miss Ethiopia | Placement at Miss Grand International | Special Awards | Notes |
|---|---|---|---|---|
Did not compete between 2019–present
| 2018 | Samrawit Azmeraw | Unplaced | | Runner-up of Miss World Ethiopia 2018 appointed at Miss Grand International Ethiopia 2018. |
| 2017 | Selamawit Teklay | Unplaced | | |
| 2016 | Genet Tsegay | Unplaced | | |
| 2015 | Bethelhem Belay | Unplaced | Top 36 – Miss Popular Vote | |
| 2014 | Hiwot Bekele Mamo | 1st Runner-up | | Runner-up of Miss Ethiopia 2014 appointed as Miss Grand International Ethiopia 2014. |
| 2013 | Helen Getachew | Unplaced | | |

=== Miss Intercontinental Ethiopia ===
- : Declared as Winner
- : Ended as runner-up or top 5/6 qualification
- : Ended as one of the finalists or semifinalists
- : Ended as special awards winner

| Year | Miss Ethiopia | Placement at Miss Intercontinental | Special Awards | Notes |
|---|---|---|---|---|
| 2019 | Rebka Fikre Tesfaye | Unplaced | | |
| 2018 | Bella Lire Lapso | 5th Runner-Up | Miss Intercontinental Africa | Runner-up of Miss World Ethiopia 2018 appointed as Miss Intercontinental Ethiopia 2018. |
| 2017 | Feven Araya Gabreslassie | Did not compete | | |
Did not compete between 2012—2016
| 2011 | Betelhem Hailu Legesse | Top 5 | | |
| 2010 | Rodina Kebede Gebremariam | Unplaced | | |
| 2009 | Hiwot Assefa Tesfaye | Top 15 | Miss Intercontinental Africa | |
| 2008 | Did not compete | | | |
| 2007 | Hayat Ahmed Mohammed | Top 16 | | |
| 2006 | Mehrete Girmay | Unplaced | | |
| 2005 | Sayat Demissie | Unplaced | | |
| 2004 | Yordanos Teshager Bitew | 4th Runner-Up | | |
| 2003 | Jerusalem Ketema Geda | Unplaced | | |

== See also ==
- Miss Universe Ethiopia
