= Ioana Mihalache =

Romanian actress, model and economist (born 1990)

- Born: Ioana Mihalache; December 28, 1990 (age 35); Constanța, Romania
- Height: 5 ft 11 in (180 cm)
- Beauty pageant titleholder
- Title: Miss Universe Romania 2017
- Hair color: Blonde
- Eye color: Brown
- Major competitions: Miss Universe Romania 2012 (3rd Runner-up); Miss World Romania 2013 (1st Runner-up); Miss Earth 2013 (Unplaced); Miss Grand International 2016 (Unplaced); Miss Universe Romania 2017 (Winner); Miss Universe 2017 (Unplaced)

Ioana Mihalache (born December 28, 1990) is a Romanian actress, model, economist and beauty pageant titleholder who was crowned Miss Universe Romania 2017. She represented Romania at the Miss Universe 2017 pageant.

== Personal life ==
Mihalache was born in Constanța, Romania.

== Education ==
Mihalache graduated from Ovidius University in Constanţa with a degree in economics and a master's degree in European Regional Development Policies. In addition to her native Romanian, Mihalache speaks three other languages: English, Spanish and Italian.

== Career ==
Mihalache's modeling career started at 15. As an international model, Mihalache has participated in fashion shows in, among other countries, the United States, Great Britain, Italy, Turkey, Lebanon, China, and the United Arab Emirates.

== Pageantry ==
=== Miss Universe Romania 2012 ===
Mihalache was declared third runner-up at Miss Universe Romania 2012.

=== Miss World Romania 2013 ===
Mihalache was also declared first runner up at the Miss World Romania 2013. and went on to represent Romania in Miss Earth 2013 in the Philippines.

=== Miss Earth 2013 ===
Mihalache represented Romania at the Miss Earth 2013 in the Philippines but unplaced.

=== Miss Grand International 2016 ===
Mihalache was appointed Miss Grand Romania 2016 and then competed at the Miss Grand International 2016 but was unplaced.

=== Miss Universe Romania 2017 ===
Mihalache was crowned as Miss Universe Romania 2017 after defeating 23 other contestants competing for the title and would go on to represent Romania in the Miss Universe 2017 international pageant held in Las Vegas.

=== Miss Universe 2017 ===
Mihalache represented Romania at the Miss Universe 2017 in Las Vegas but unplaced.

Awards and achievements
Preceded by Teodora Dan	Miss Universe Romania; 2017	Succeeded by Dorina Chihaia
