= Miss Grand Botswana 2014 =

1st Miss Grand Botswana competition

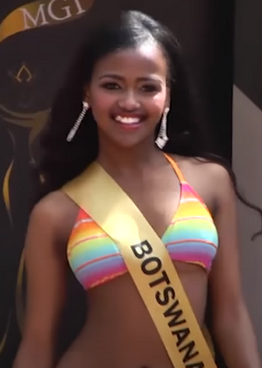
- Lillian Molose, the winner of the contest
- Date: 8 August 2014
- Venue: Botswana National Youth Council, Gaborone
- Entrants: 13
- Placements: 6
- Winner: Lillian Molose (South-East)
- Photogenic: Carole Ngisi (North-East)

Miss Grand Botswana 2014 was the first edition of the Miss Grand Botswana pageant, organized on 8 August 2014 at the Botswana National Youth Council (BNYC) in the capital Gaborone. Thirteen contestants from different districts and cities of Botswana competed for the title. Of whom, a 19-year-old geology student representing South-East, Lillian Molose, was named the winner. Molose later represented the country in the Miss Grand International 2014 pageant held on 7 October 2014 in Thailand, but was unplaced.

The contest, which was initially scheduled for 26 July 2024 at the Cresta Lodge Hotel in Gaborone, was organized by a South African businessman named Dineo Matlapeng. However, it was subsequently rescheduled for 8 August for unknown reasons.

== Result ==
Miss Grand Botswana 2024 competition result by district
Color key:
Winner	1st runner-up
2nd runner-up	Top 6
Unplaced	No representative

Placement	Contestant
Miss Grand Botswana 2014	South-East – Lillian Molose
1st runner-up	North-East – Carole Ngisi (Note: Automatically qualified for the top 6 finalists after winning the Miss Photogenic vote.)
2nd runner-up	Central – Oweditse Phirinyane
Top 6	North-West – Tsaone Boikhutso; Kweneng – Onalenna Phofedi; Ghanzi – Andreanne Gasebalwe
Special award
Miss Photogenic	North-East – Carole Ngisi

== Contestants ==
External videos
- Contestants Introduction Video

Thirteen candidates competed for the title.

Represented	Candidate	Age (Note: Age at the time of the pageant.)	Hometown	Ref.
Central	Oweditse Phirinyane	19	Serowe	
Chobe	Gaolebale Lekau	21	Kasane	
Francistown	Modeline Mbaakanyi	19	Tutume	
Gaborone	Tebogo Lebanna	19	Gaborone	
Ghanzi	Andreanne Gasebalwe	19	Rakops	
Kgalagadi	Lebogang Kaisara	25	Kalamare	
Kgatleng	Kefilwe Barobetse	22	Lentsweletau	
Kweneng	Onalenna Phofedi	21	Letlhakeng	
North-East	Carole Ngisi	21	Makaleng	
North-West	Tsaone Boikhutso	21	Maun	
Selebi-Phikwe	Kelly Charles	21	Mmadinare	
Southern	Gomolemo Majafhe	21	Mmankgodi	
South-East	Lillian Molose	19	Ramotswa	
