= Sanna-Kaisa Saari =

Swedish and Finnish beauty pageant winner (born 1987)

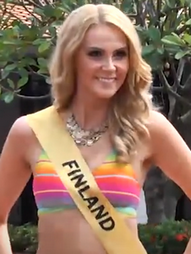
Sanna-Kaisa Saari in 2014

Sanna-Kaisa Saari (born 3 October 1987) is a Swedish and Finnish model and beauty pageant titleholder. Saari represented Sweden at Miss Tourism Queen International 2009 in China where she was 2nd runner-up in the Miss Charm special award. She also represented Sweden at Miss Tourism International 2010 in Malaysia.

She represented Finland in the Top Model of the World 2010 in Germany. She was also a finalist in the Finnish Miss Suomi pageant in 2012, then was later appointed Miss Grand Finland 2014 to compete at the Miss Grand International 2014 in Thailand, but was unplaced.

In 2019, she started as a Finnish presenter of the mobile game show Primetime.

== Early and personal life ==
Saari was born in Ekenäs, Finland. She had moved to Sweden with her mother at a young age. In 2011, Saari moved back to Finland.
