= Miss Grand Cameroon =

Beauty pageant in Cameroon

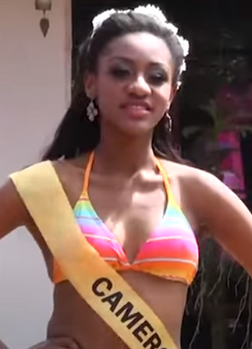
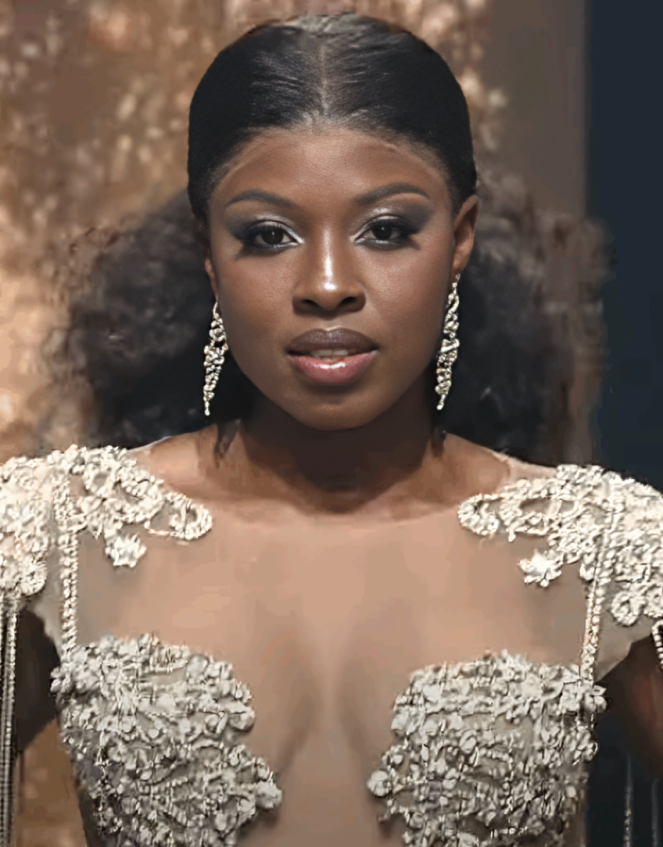
- Laeticia Ndzana (2014) Sharlynn Acha (2024)
- Formation: 2013
- Type: Beauty pageant
- Headquarters: Yaoundé
- Location: Cameroon
- Official language: French
- National director: Ndolo Enanga
- Parent organization: Cameroon Pageant Academy (2024 – Present)
- Affiliations: Miss Grand International

Miss Grand Cameroon
licensees timeline

Under other pageants
Appointed titleholder
No licensee/titleholder

Miss Grand Cameroon is a beauty pageant title given to Cameroonian representatives competing at the Miss Grand International pageant. The first titleholder was Marie Cecile Olga, who was appointed to the position in 2013 by the director of Megane Fashion International and Olga's agent, Armstrong Loga. The license was then transferred to a newly established national contest headed by Marina Tchassem Fankam named Miss Prestige Cameroun and to Angèle Kossinda in 2014 and 2022, respectively.

There is no Miss Grand National in Cameroon. All Cameroon representatives at Miss Grand International were either appointed or elected through other national contests, such as Miss Prestige Cameroun (2014 and 2016) and Miss Face of Cameroon (2024 and 2025).

Since 2013, Cameroon has participated in Miss Grand International twice, in 2014 and 2024. Other assigned titleholders did not enter the international pageant for unrevealed reasons.

== History ==
Initially, Cameroon was expected to make a debut at Miss Grand International in 2013 by an appointed representative, Marie Cecile Olga, but she withdrew for undisclosed reasons. The license was then taken over by Marina Tchassem Fankam the following year, and she subsequently established a new national pageant, Miss Prestige Cameroun, to select the winner to compete at the Miss Grand International 2014 pageant in Thailand.

The inaugural of Miss Prestige Cameroun was held in the country's capital city, Yaoundé, and featured 20 national finalists, of whom a second-year economics student from the University of Yaoundé II, Leticia Ndzana, was elected the winner. She then competed at Miss Grand International 2014 in Thailand, making her the first Cameroonian candidate to compete at such an international pageant, but she was unplaced.

Since the national contest was conducted too late in 2015, the winner of the contest, Olivia Ngalle, was set to represent the country at Miss Grand International 2016 instead; (Note: The organizer gave an interview to the press before the 2015 national final night that the contest winner will be sent to compete internationally in the Miss Grand International pageant.) however, she withdrew and the partnership between Miss Prestige Cameroun and Miss Grand International was terminated that year.

After five consecutive years of no representatives, former Miss Universe Cameroon, Angèle Kossinda, was assigned Miss Grand Cameroon in 2022 and was expected to join the international stage in Indonesia, but also withdrew.

Cameroon returned to the competition in the 2024 contest in Thailand after the license was granted to Ndolo Enanga, the Miss Face of Cameroon organizer. The winner of that year's contest, Sharlynn Acha, was named Miss Grand Cameroon 2024.

== International competition ==
The following is a list of Cameroonian representatives at the Miss Grand International contest.

Color keys

- : Declared as the winner
- : Ended as a runner-up (Top 5)
- : Ended as a finalist (Top 10)
- : Ended as a semifinalist (Top 20)
- : Ended as special awards winner

Year	Miss Grand Cameroon	Title	Placement	Special Awards	National Director
2025	Theresia Mah Awagea	Miss Face of Cameroon 2025	Unable to compete		Ndolo Enanga
2024	Sharlynn Acha	Miss Face of Cameroon 2024	Unplaced		Ndolo Enanga
Did not compete in 2023
2022	Angèle Kossinda	Miss Universe Cameroon 2020	Did not compete		Angèle Kossinda
Did not compete between 2017-2021
2016	Olivia Ngallé	Miss Prestige Cameroun 2015	Did not compete		Marina Tchassem Fankam
Did not compete in 2015
2014	Laeticia Ndzana	Miss Prestige Cameroun 2014	Unplaced		Marina Tchassem Fankam
2013	Marie Cecile Olga	Miss Tourism Cameroon 2010	Did not compete		Armstrong Loga
