= Miss Grand Kenya 2024 =

1st Miss Grand Kenya competition, beauty pageant edition

- Date: 31 August 2024
- Venue: Delight Africa Hall, Nairobi
- Broadcaster: Facebook
- Director: Tanveen Onyango
- Producer: The Drop Models Kenya
- Entrants: 9
- Placements: 5
- Winner: Magdelene Takangiro (Rift Valley-North)
- Miss Congeniality: Kamonya Brandy (Western)

Miss Grand Kenya 2024 was the inaugural edition of the Miss Grand Kenya pageant, held on 31 August 2024 at the Delight Africa Hall in Nairobi. Nine Contestants from different provinces of the country competed for the title. It was won by a 22-year-old clinical medicine and surgery student at Kabarak University, Magdelene Takangiro of Turkana County, Rift Valley Province.

Initially, Magdelene Takangiro was speculated to represent the country at the international parent stage, Miss Grand International 2025, (Note: Even though the winner of Miss Grand Kenya 2024 was expected to participate in the 12th edition of Miss Grand International, the Kenyan organization later announced their representative would only compete internationally in 2025) in Thailand on 18 October 2025, nevertheless, the organizer has not yet renewed the license for Kenya, rendering her ineligible for the aforementioned contest.

== Result ==
Miss Grand Kenya 2024 competition results by province
Color key:
Winner	1st runner-up
2nd runner-up	Top 5
Unplaced

=== Placements ===
Placement	Contestant
Miss Grand Kenya 2024	Rift Valley – North – Magdelene Takangiro
1st Runner-up	Coast – Purity Khabukwi
2nd Runner-up	Central – Joy Awiti Favour
Top 5	Rift Valley – South – Margaret Furaha; Nyanza – Stephanie Auma

=== Special awards ===
Award	Contestant
Miss Congeniality	Western – Kamonya Brandy
Miss Peoples Choice	Rift Valley-South – Margaret Furaha
Miss Top Model	Nyanza – Stephanie Auma

== Contestants ==
Nine contestants competed for the title:

- Central – Joy Awiti Favour
- Coast – Purity Khabukwi
- Eastern – Donnata Risper
- Nairobi – Samantha Kemama
- North Eastern – Wilhelmine Atieno
- Nyanza – Stephanie Auma
- Rift Valley-North – Magdelene Takangiro
- Rift Valley-South – Margaret Furaha
- Western – Kamonya Brandy
