= Miss Grand Luxembourg =

List of Luxembourg representatives at Miss Grand International

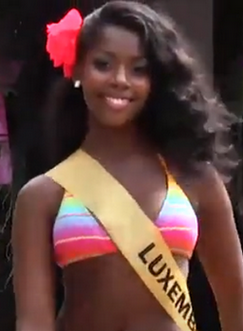
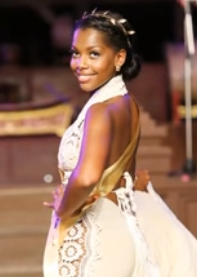
- Corinne Furtado, Miss Grand Luxembourg 2014
- Formation: 2014
- Type: Beauty pageant
- Headquarters: Luxembourg City
- Location: Luxembourg
- Members: Miss Grand International
- Official language: Luxembourgish; English
- National director: Natascha Bintz

Miss Grand Luxembourg is a national female beauty pageant title awarded to Luxembourg representatives competing at the Miss Grand International pageant. The title was first awarded in 2014 to Corinne Semedo Furtado, who previously won the second position at the Miss Luxembourg 2013 pageant, and then was assigned to represent the country at the Miss Grand International 2014 contest in Thailand. Another titleholder, Natascha Bintz, was also appointed in 2016.

Since the establishment of Miss Grand International, Luxembourg only participated twice; in 2014 and 2016. However, both of its representatives were unplaced on the international stages. Due to lacking national licensee, no Luxembourg candidates at Miss Grand International since 2017.

== International competition ==
The following is a list of Luxembourg representatives at the Miss Grand International contest.

Year	Representative	Original national title	Competition performance	
Year	Representative	Original national title	Placement	Other awards
2014	Corinne Semedo Furtado	1st runner-up Miss Luxembourg 2013	Unplaced	—N/a
2016	Natascha Bintz	3rd runner-up Miss Luxembourg 2010	Unplaced	—N/a
No representatives 2017-2025
2026	TBA	TBA	TBA	TBA
