= Miss Grand North Macedonia =

North Macedonia beauty pageant title

- Formation: 2013
- Type: Beauty pageant
- Headquarters: Skopje
- Location: North Macedonia
- Members: Miss Grand International
- Official language: Macedonian
- National director: Zoran Vasilevski (2025)
- Parent organization: Crnokrak Fashion Studio (2013); D+D Fashion Woman (2015); Miss North Macedonia Org. (2025)

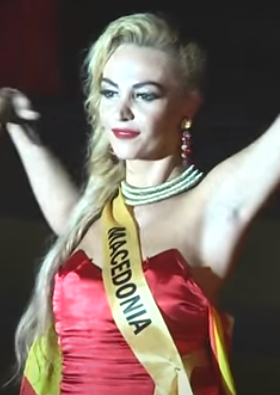
Dunavka Trifunovska
(2015)

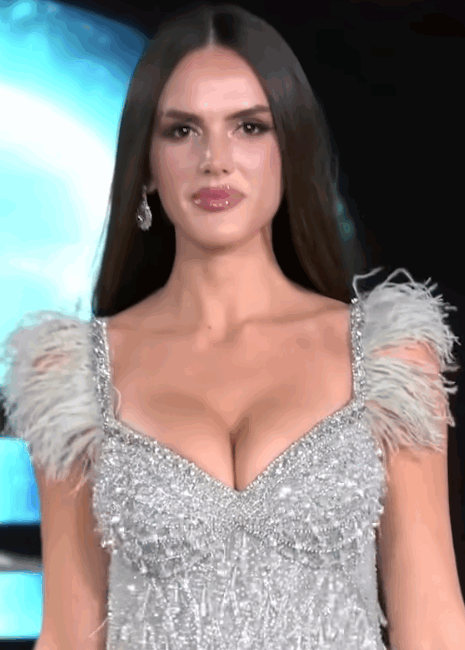
Ilirjana Saliu
(2025)

Miss Grand North Macedonia is a national female beauty pageant title awarded to Macedonian representatives competing at the Miss Grand International pageant. The title was first awarded in 2013 when Sandra Stefanovska was assigned by Crnokrak Fashion Studio to represent the country at the inaugural edition of Miss Grand International in Thailand. The second titleholder was Dunavka Trifunovska who purchased the franchise and dominated herself to partake in the international tournament in 2015.

Since the establishment of Miss Grand International, Macedonia sent its representatives to compete only in 2013 and 2015, one of them, Sandra Stefanovska, qualified for the final-20 round.

== History ==
Macedonia debuted in Miss Grand International in 2013 after the Skopje-based model agency, Crnokrak Fashion Studio (Macedonian: Модното студио Црнокрак), obtained the franchise and assigned their-affiliated model, Sandra Stefanovska, to compete internationally in Thailand, where she was placed among the top 20 finalists. Crnokrak Fashion Studio is managed by Miki Crnokrak (Macedonian: Мики Црнокрак).

In 2015, the license was granted to a Skopje-based pharmacist and founder of a fashion agency named D+D Fashion Woman, Dunavka Trifunovska, who then dominated herself as the country representative at the international competition held in Thailand in October of that year. However, some media reported that Trifunovska was actually 34 years old, not 24, as specified in the documents registering with the organizer committee, which violated the criteria of the pageant since women over the age of 28 were not allowed to enter the contest. The Miss Grand International Organization has not made any official announcement, nor has it confirmed anything regarding the age controversy.

Due to lacking franchise holders, the Macedonian representatives for Miss Grand International have not additionally been elected since 2016.

== International competition ==
The following is a list of Macedonian representatives at the Miss Grand International contest.

Year	Representative	Original national title	Competition performance		National licensee
Year	Representative	Original national title	Placement	Other awards	National licensee
2013	Sandra Stefanovska	Appointed	Top 20	—N/a	Miki Crnokrak
2015	Dunavka Trifunovska	Self-dominated	Unplaced	—N/a	Dunavka Trifunovska
No representatives from 2016 to 2024
2025	Ilirjana Saliu	Appointed	Unplaced	—N/a	Zoran Vasilevski
Did not compete in 2026
