= Miss Grand Kenya =

Kenyan beauty pageant title

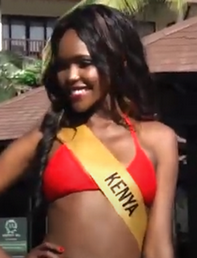
- Elaine Mwangi, Miss Grand Kenya 2015
- Formation: 31 August 2024; 19 months ago
- Founder: Tanveen Onyango
- Type: Beauty pageant
- Headquarters: Nairobi
- Location: Kenya
- Official language: English
- National director: Tanveen Onyango (2024)
- Parent organization: Beauties of Africa Inc. (2013); Miss Kenya (2015)
- Affiliations: Miss Grand International

Miss Grand Kenya is a national female beauty pageant in Kenya, established in 2024 by Tanveen Onyango, chairperson of The Drop Models Kenya modeling school, to select the country's representatives for the Miss Grand International pageant. Prior to the creation of this formal national competition, all Kenyan representatives were appointed, the first being Pauline Akwacha, a national finalist of Miss World Kenya 2012, who was designated by Beauties of Africa Inc., under the direction of Andy Abulime, to compete at the inaugural Miss Grand International in Thailand in 2013.

Kenya's only placement at Miss Grand International occurred in 2020, when Irene Ng’endo advanced to the top twenty finalists.

== History ==
Since its inception of Miss Grand International, Kenya has participated intermittently in the pageant. In 2013, Pauline Akwacha, a Nairobi-based model and Miss World Kenya 2012 finalist, was selected by Beauties of Africa Inc., under Andy Abulime, to represent the country at the inaugural edition in Thailand, but she did not place.

After a hiatus, Tony Chirah, director of Miss Kenya, held the title as a supplementary award in the 2014 national pageant, and the candidate was sent to the 2015 international event, while no Kenyan representatives competed from 2016 to 2019. In 2020, Irene Mukii, winner of Miss Africa 2019, acquired the license and appointed herself to compete in Thailand, reaching the top twenty finalists.

In 2024, the first standalone Miss Grand Kenya pageant was held, and Magdalene Takangiro was crowned; however, she is currently ineligible for the 2025 international edition, as the national license has not yet been renewed.

== Edition ==
=== Location and date ===
The following is the competition detail of the Miss Grand Kenya pageant, held as a stand-alone pageant only once in 2024.

Edition	Date	Final venue	Entrants	Ref.
31 August 2024	Delight Africa Hall, Nairobi	9		

=== Competition result ===
Edition	Winner	Runners-up		Ref.
Edition	Winner	First	Second	Ref.
1st	Magdelene Takangiro (Note: Even though the winner of Miss Grand Kenya 2024 was expected to participate in the Miss Grand International 2024, the Kenyan organization later announced their representative would only compete internationally in 2025, but withdrew due to no national license purchased.) (Rift Valley – North)	Purity Khabukwi (Coast)	Joy Awiti Favour (Central)	

== International competition ==
The following is a list of Kenyan representatives at the Miss Grand International contest.

Color keys

- : Declared as the winner
- : Ended as a runner-up (Top 5)
- : Ended as a finalist (Top 10)
- : Ended as a semifinalist (Top 20/21)
- : Ended as special awards winner

Year	Miss Grand Kenya	Title	Placement	Special Awards	National Director
2025	Magdalene Takangiro	Miss Grand Kenya 2024	Did not complete		Tanveen Onyango
Did not compete between 2021-2024
2020	Irene Ng'endo	Miss Africa 2019	Top 20		Irene Ng'endo
Did not compete between 2016-2019
2015	Elaine Mwangi	Miss Grand Kenya 2015 (Note: Supplementary title at the Miss Kenya 2015 pageant.)	Unplaced		Tony Chirah
Did not compete in 2014
2013	Pauline Akwacha	Top 10 finalist Miss World Kenya 2012	Unplaced		Andy Abulime

== Participating national finalists ==
The following list is the national finalists of the Miss Grand Kenya pageant and the competition results.

Represented	1st
Central	
Coast	
Eastern	Y
Nairobi	Y
North Eastern	Y
Nyanza	Y
Rift Valley-North	
Rift Valley-South	Y
Western	Y
Total	9
Color keys: : Declared as the winner; : Ended as a 1st runner-up; : Ended as a 2nd runner-up; A : Ended as a finalist, semifinalist (N) and unplaced (Y); × : Ended as withdrew during the competition; × : Ended as no representative
