= Señorita México U.S. =

Señorita México U.S. was an annual beauty pageant that brought together Mexican women from all over the United States to compete for the national title of Señorita Mexico U.S in Las Vegas, Nevada. The winner of the contest got to compete abroad at the Miss Globe International pageant.

The last Señorita Mexico U.S. was Gemma Kassandra Mendoza of Chihuahua an economics graduate from University of Colorado at Boulder who was crowned on May 17, 2015, in Las Vegas, Nevada.

The pageant was interrupted in 2007 and reinstated in 2010 due to a lawsuit with regard to the Señorita Mexico U.S Trademark, which The Miss Mexico Organization was able to keep after a successful settlement and a three years legal dispute against Miss Universe.

== Recent titleholders ==
Year	Winner	State of Representation
2015	Gemma Kassandra Mendoza	Chihuahua
2014	Setareh Khatibi	Sinaloa
2013	Michelle Rivas	Chihuahua
2012	Sarah López	Michoacán
2011	Mariana Ríos	Michoacán
2010	Jocell Villa	Sinaloa
2007	Jamillette Gaxiola	Sinaloa
2006	Damaris García	Chihuahua
2005	Yesenia Munguía,	Jalisco
2004	Karina Cervantes	Durango

== See also ==
- Señorita Mexico
