= Miss Grand Botswana =

Beauty pageant in Botswana

- 2014 competition logo
- Formation: 8 August 2014
- Founder: Dineo Matlapeng
- Type: Beauty pageant
- Headquarters: Gaborone
- Location: Botswana
- Official language: English
- National director: Dineo Matlapeng
- Affiliations: Miss Grand International

Miss Grand Botswana is a national beauty pageant for women in Botswana, established in 2014 by Dineo Matlapeng, a businessperson based in Gaborone. The winner of the competition is designated to represent Botswana at its affiliated international pageant, Miss Grand International. To date, Botswana has participated in the Miss Grand International contest on a single occasion, in 2014, during which its representative did not achieve placement among the finalists.

Since the 2014 edition, no further representatives from Botswana have competed in the Miss Grand International pageant, and the national license has not subsequently been acquired or administered by any other pageant-related organization.

== History ==
Botswana has participated in the Miss Grand International pageant on a singular occasion, in 2014. The country was represented by Lillian Lillie Dlamini, a nineteen-year-old geology student at the Botswana International University of Science and Technology, who secured victory in the inaugural Miss Grand International Botswana pageant. This national competition was organized by Dineo Matlapeng, a businessperson based in Gaborone, and featured thirteen candidates. The event was initially scheduled for 26 July at the Cresta Lodge Hotel in Gaborone; however, it was subsequently postponed to 8 August and relocated to the Botswana National Youth Council (BNYC).

Since the 2014 edition, no further representatives from Botswana have competed in the Miss Grand International pageant.

== Edition ==
Miss Grand Botswana pageant was held as a stand-alone pageant only once in 2014, as detailed below.

Year	Edition	Date	Final venue	Entrants	Winner	Ref.
2014	1st	August 8	Botswana National Youth Council, Gaborone	13	South-East – Lillian Molose	

== International competition ==
The following is a list of Botswana representatives at the Miss Grand International contest.

Year	Representative	Original national title	Result		National director
Year	Representative	Original national title	Placement	Other awards	National director
2014	Lillian Molose	Miss Grand Botswana 2014	Unplaced	—N/a	Dineo Matlapeng

== Gallery ==
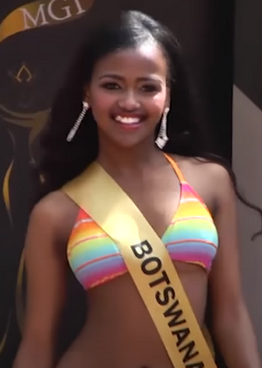
Lillian Molose, Miss Grand Botswana 2014
