= Miss Grand Iran =

Iranian beauty pageant title

- Formation: 2014; 12 years ago
- Founder: Roxana Gholinezhad
- Type: Beauty pageant
- Headquarters: London
- Location: United Kingdom
- Members: Miss Grand International
- Official language: Persian; English
- National director: Daniela Costin; Roxana Gholinezhad (2026)
- Parent organization: Miss Iran (2013–2017, 2020)
- Website: MissGrandIran.com

Miss Grand Iran is a national beauty pageant title awarded to representatives of Iran who compete in the Miss Grand International competition. The title was first conferred in 2014 upon Bahareh Heidari, the winner of Miss Iran 2013, who subsequently represented Iran at the Miss Grand International 2014 pageant in Thailand; however, she did not place in the competition.

Traditionally, winners of the Miss Iran pageant were also designated as Miss Grand Iran titleholders until 2021, when the contractual relationship with Miss Grand International was terminated. Following this change, the national titleholder was instead selected to represent Iran at the Miss Earth competition.

Since the establishment of the Miss Grand International contest, Iran has participated on three occasions, with all of its representatives failing to achieve placement.

== History ==
Following the 1979 Islamic Revolution in Iran, beauty pageants were officially prohibited, and several national pageants that had previously been held on an annual basis were abolished. In 2013, George Clooney, an Iranian-American television producer and chairperson of the Australia-based media company IMAJH, established a virtual beauty pageant titled Miss Iran. The inaugural titleholder, Bahareh Heidari, subsequently represented Iran at the Miss Grand International 2014 competition in Thailand. The partnership between IMAJH and Miss Grand International was terminated in 2021, after which the national pageant was rebranded as Queen of Persia. Under this new title, the winner was selected to represent Iran at the Miss Earth competition instead.

In a related development, Atefeh Eskandari, the 2016 titleholder, was arrested and imprisoned by Iranian authorities due to her participation in a beauty pageant and the publication of images deemed sexually provocative under the laws of the Islamic Republic of Iran. She was released in early 2021 after serving nearly five years in prison.

After five consecutive years of absence, two London-based pageant organizers, Daniela Costin and Roxana Mohammad Gholinezhad, acquired the Miss Grand Iran license in 2026 and the first standalone Miss Grand Iran pageant was then held in July 2026 in London, United Kingdom.

== Edition ==
The following is a list of editions of the Miss Grand Iran pageant, which was held as a stand-alone competition once in 2026.

| Edition | Date | Final venue | Entrants | Winner | Ref. |
|---|---|---|---|---|---|
| 1st | 18 July 2026 | Wyllyotts Theatre & Cinema, Potters Bar, England | 15 | Nina Izadpanah | |
| 2nd | TBA | TBA | TBA | TBA | |

== International competition ==
The following is a list of Iranian representatives at the Miss Grand International contest.

| Year | Representative | | Original national title | Competition Performance | | National director |
| Year | English name | Persian name | Original national title | Placement | Special Award(s) | National director |
|---|---|---|---|---|---|---|
| 2014 | Bahareh Heidari | بهاره حیدری | Miss Iran 2013 | Unplaced | —N/a | George Clooney |
| 2015 | Shadi Osmani | شادی عثمانی | Miss Iran 2014 | Unplaced | —N/a | George Clooney |
| 2016 | Atefeh Eskandari | عاطفه اسکندری | Miss Iran 2015 | Did not compete | | George Clooney |
| 2017 | Sonia Beytoushi | سونیا بیطوشی | Miss Iran 2016 | Did not compete | | George Clooney |
| 2020 | Ayda Mirahmadi | آیدا میراحمدی | Miss Iran 2020 | Unplaced | —N/a | George Clooney |
No representatives from 2021 to 2025
| 2026 | Nina Izadpanah | نینا ایزدپناه | Miss Grand Iran 2026 | Did not compete | | Daniela Costin & Roxana Gholinezhad |
| 2026 | Tanin Alemi Baygy | طنین عالمی بیگی | Miss Grand Iran 2026 – 1st ruuner-up | TBA | TBA | Daniela Costin & Roxana Gholinezhad |

== Titleholder gallery ==
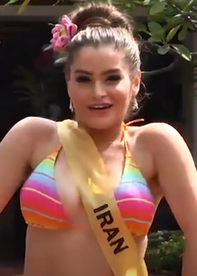
Bahareh Heidari
Miss Grand Iran 2014

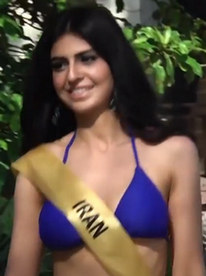
Shadi Osmani
Miss Grand Iran 2015
