= Miss Grand Finland =

Beauty pageant in Finland

- Formation: 2013
- Type: Beauty pageant
- Headquarters: Stockholm
- Location: Sweden
- Members: Miss Grand International
- Official language: English; Finnish
- National director: Peter Hadward
- General director: Kersten Liba
- Parent organization: Fashion Model Agency (2013 – 2014, 2017 – 2018); Miss Queen of Scandinavia (2020)
- Website: MissQueenOfScandinavia.com

Miss Grand Finland is a national beauty pageant title awarded to Finnish representatives competing at the Miss Grand International pageant. The title was first introduced in 2013 when a 22-year-old tourism student from Rovaniemi, Katariina Suuniitty, was appointed as Miss Grand Finland after participating in the Miss Finland 2013 pageant.

From 2013 to 2018, the license of Miss Grand Finland belonged to a Helsinki-based modeling agency, Fashion Model Agency, chaired by Merja Kupiainen-Groundstroem. After an absence in 2019, the license was obtained by a sub-continental pageant headquartered in Stockholm, Miss Queen of Scandinavia, where the Miss Grand Finland title was considered one of the supplement awards in the event.

== History ==
Finland made its first appearance at the Miss Grand International stage in 2013 after Merja Kupiainen-Groundstroem, CEO of the Fashion Model Agency, purchased the license and subsequently assigned Katariina Suuniitty, who previously competed at the Miss Finland 2013 pageant, to compete at the inaugural edition of Miss Grand International in Thailand. Merja ended her partnership with Miss Grand International in 2018; under her direction, all of Finland's representatives were appointed, and all were finalists in the Miss Finland pageant.

One year after the franchise relinquishment, Miss Queen of Scandinavia, a Sweden-based sub-continental pageant chaired by Peter Hadward obtained the license.

Since the first competition in 2013, Finnish representatives have never been placed in Miss Grand International.

== International competition ==
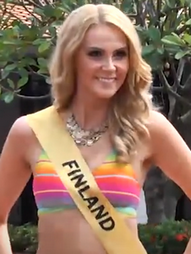
Sanna-Kaisa Saari, Miss Grand Finland 2014

The following is a list of Finnish representatives at the Miss Grand International contest.

Year	Representative	Original national title	International result	
Year	Representative	Original national title	Placement	Other awards
2013	Katariina Suuniitty	Miss Finland 2013 Finalist	Unplaced	—
2014	Sanna-Kaisa Saari	Miss Finland 2012 Finalist	Unplaced	—
2015	No representatives			
2016	No representatives			
2017	Eveliina Tikka	Miss Finland 2017 Finalist	Unplaced	—
2018	Erika Miranda Helin	Miss Finland 2018 Finalist	Unplaced	—
2019	No representative			
2020	Liina Ilona Malinen	Miss Grand Finland 2020	Unplaced	—
No representatives since 2021
