= Delia Duca =

Romanian beauty pageant winner (born 1986)

Delia Monica Duca
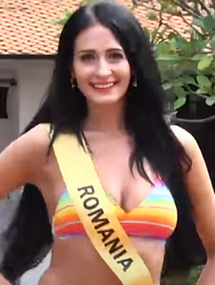
- Delia Duca in 2014
- Born: Delia Monica Duca; 7 May 1986 (age 40); Brașov, Romania
- Height: 1.80 m (5 ft 11 in)
- Beauty pageant titleholder
- Title: Miss Universe Romania 2012
- Hair color: Black
- Major competitions: Miss Universe Romania 2012 (Winner); Miss Universe 2012 (Unplaced); Miss Grand International 2014 (Unplaced)

Delia Duca Iliescu (or Delia Monica Duca; born in 1986) is a Romanian former beauty pageant contestant and chess player who has hosted the chess-themed television show "Strategie in alb si negru" ("Strategy in black and white"”) on the Romanian channel Realitatea Plus since 2015. She was Miss Universe Romania 2012 and represented her country at Miss Universe 2012. She is an IT professional, a chess player and FIDE chess arbiter.

== Pageant experiences ==
- In 2008, she competed at Miss Tourism Queen International 2008 (China), and placed in Top 20 semi-finalists.
- In 2010, she competed at Miss Globe International 2010 (Cyprus), and placed in Top 15 semi-finalists and was awarded as Miss Sympathy.
- In 2011, she won the title Miss Intercontinental Romania and competed in Miss Intercontinental 2011 (Spain).
- In 2012, she competed at Miss United Nations 2012 (USA) and won the Supermodel United Nations 2012 title.
- In 2012, she competed at Supermodel International 2012 (Thailand) where she placed Top 15 and she was awarded Miss Sun City.
- In 2012, she won Miss Universe Romania 2012 and represented Romania at Miss Universe 2012 (USA).
- In 2013, she won the 2nd runner-up title at Miss 7 Continents 2013 (Turkey).
- In 2013, she placed in Top 5 at Princess of the Globe 2013 (Turkey).
- In 2014, she was appointed Miss Grand Romania 2014 and then competed at Miss Grand International 2014 (Thailand).
- In 2015, she won Miss Diamond of the World 2015 (Algeria).

== Other achievements ==
Duca has a master's degree in computer science and works as a software engineer. She was national champion in solving chess problems in 2006, and is a published chess problem composer. She has organised and served as arbiter in multiple chess tournaments, and holds the FIDE titles of Woman Candidate Master and FIDE Arbiter.

Awards and achievements
Preceded by Larisa Popa	Miss Universe Romania; 2012	Succeeded by Oana Andrei
Preceded by Iuliana Stefania Vasile	Miss Grand Romania; 2014	Succeeded by TBA
