= Miss Romania =

National beauty pageant competition in Romania

Miss Universe România Organization
- Formation: 1928; 98 years ago
- Type: Beauty pageant
- Headquarters: Bucharest
- Location: Romania
- Members: Miss Universe
- Official language: Romanian
- Key people: Ernest Hadrian Böhm
- Website: www.missuniverseromania.com

The Miss Universe România is a national beauty pageant that has selected Romania's representative to the Miss Universe pageant.

== History ==
The Miss România was initially established in the late 1920s, Magda Demetrescu won the first pageant in 1929. She then participated in the former Miss Universe pageant (officially the International Pageant of Pulchritude) in Texas, where she placed sixth. The following year, Mariana Mirica placed third. After this Texas international pageant ended in 1932, Dorothee Cristescu participated in "Miss Universe" Brussels in 1935.

Romania's participation in international pageants ceased by 1929, though a Communist-pageant was held in the country in the 1970s.

Romania's participation in the modern Miss Universe pageant began with Miss Romania Daniella Nane who participated in Miss Universe 1991, and where the famous Romanian gymnast Nadia Comăneci served on the international jury. After 1998, Romania dropped from Miss Universe for 11 years, and returned in 2009. In 2016, the license to celebrate the contest Miss Universe Romania was granted to the company Royal Business Corporation, having Mr. Ernest Hadrian Böhm as Owner and CEO.

== Titleholders ==
Year	Miss România	County
1928	Marioara Ganesco	Bucharest
1929	Magda Demetrescu	Bucharest
1930	Mariana Mirică	Bucharest
1931	Erastia Peretz	Bucharest
1979	Matilda Pascal	Bucharest
1991	Daniela Nane	Iași
1992	Corina Corduneanu	Bucharest
1993	Angelica Nicoară	Arad
1994	Mihaela Ciolacu	Bucharest
1995	Monika Grosu	Bucharest
1996	Roberta Anastase	Prahova
1997	Diana Maria Urdareanu	Timiș
1998	Iuliana Elena Verdeș	Bucharest
1999	Nicoleta Luciu	Bucharest
2000	Alexandra Cosmoiu	Bucharest
2001	Vanda Petre	Bucharest
2002	Cleopatra Popescu	Sibiu
2003	Patricia Chifor	Bucharest
2004	Adina Maria Cotuna	Arad
2005	Raluca Voina	Bucharest
2006	Ioana Valentina Boitor	Satu Mare
2007	Elena Roxana Azoitei	Bucharest
2008	Ruxandra Popa	Prahova
2009	Elena Bianca Constantin	Bucharest
2010	Alexandra Cătălina Filip; Resigned	Bucharest
2010	Oana Paveluc	Brașov
2011	Larisa Popa	Olt
2012	Evelyn Iulia Dicu	Râmnicu Vâlcea
2013	Roxana Oana Andrei	Dâmbovița
2016	Teodora Dan	Dolj
2017	Ioana Mihalache	Constanța
2019	Dorina Chihaia	Iași
2020	Bianca Tirsin	Arad
2021	Carmina Cotfas	Cluj
2024	Loredana Salanță	Bistrița-Năsăud
2025	Cătălina Jacob	Bacau, Bacau County

== Titleholders under Miss Universe România ==
=== Miss Universe România ===
- : Declared as Winner
- : Ended as runner-up or top 5/6 qualification
- : Ended as one of the finalists or semifinalists
- : Ended as special awards winner

The Winner of Miss Universe Romania represents the country at the Miss Universe pageant. If the winner will resign the title, the runner-up will take over the crown.

Year	County	Hometown	Miss România	Placement at Miss Universe	Special Award(s)	Notes
Ernest Hadrian Böhm (Royal Business Corporation) directorship — a franchise holder to Miss Universe from 2024
2026	Bucharest	Bucharest	Sabina-Gabriela Parmac	TBA		
2025	Bacău	Bacău	Cătălina Jacob	Unplaced		
2024	Bistrița-Năsăud	Bistrița	Loredana Salanță	Unplaced		
Sorin Constantinescu directorship — a franchise holder to Miss Universe between 2020 and 2021
Did not compete between 2022—2023
2021	Cluj	Cluj-Napoca	Carmina Cotfas	Unplaced		
2020	Arad	Arad	Bianca Tirsin	Unplaced		Bianca was 2nd Runner-up at Miss Supranational 2017 and 3rd Runner-up at Miss International 2018.
Ernest Hadrian Böhm (Exclusive Event) directorship — a franchise holder to Miss Universe between 2016 and 2029
2019	Iași	Iași	Dorina Chihaia	Unplaced		
Did not compete in 2018
2017	Constanța	Constanța	Ioana Mihalache	Unplaced		
2016	Dolj	Bucharest	Teodora Dan	Unplaced		Teodora was Miss Tourism Universe 2015.
Mike Costache and Valentina Ionescu (TVR) directorship — a franchise holder to Miss Universe between 2009 and 2013
Did not compete between 2014—2015
2013	Dâmbovița	Târgoviște	Roxana Oana Andrei	Unplaced		
2012	Brașov	Brașov	Delia Monica Duca	Unplaced		Delia was Miss Diamond of the World 2015, Top 5 at Princess of the Globe 2013, 2nd Runner-up at Miss 7 Continents 2013, Top 15 and Miss Sun City at Supermodel International 2012, Sipermodel UN award at Miss United Nations 2012, Top 15 and Miss Sympathy at Miss Globe International 2010 and Top 20 at Miss Tourism Queen International 2008
2011	Olt	Slatina	Larisa Popa	Unplaced		
2010	Brașov	Brașov	Oana Paveluc	Unplaced		Crowned new Miss Universe Romania 2010 on 14 July 2010 after Alexandra Cătălina Filip, the original winner, was dethroned, as she refused to sign the contract with the Miss Universe Organization
2009	Bucharest	Bucharest	Elena Bianca Constantin	Unplaced		
Gavrila Inoan "Miss România" directorship — a franchise holder to Miss Universe between 1991 and 1998
1998	Bucharest	Bucharest	Iuliana Elena Verdeș	Unplaced		
1997	Timiș	Timișoara	Diana Maria Urdareanu	Unplaced		
1996	Prahova	Ploiești	Roberta Anastase	Unplaced		
1995	Bucharest	Bucharest	Monika Grosu	Unplaced		
1994	Bucharest	Bucharest	Mihaela Ciolacu	Unplaced		
1993	Arad	Lipova	Angelica Nicoară	Unplaced		
1992	Bucharest	Bucharest	Corina Corduneanu	Unplaced		
1991	Iași	Iași	Daniela Nane	Unplaced		

== Hosts ==
- Valentina Ionescu

== See also ==
- List of Romania representatives at international beauty pageants
