= Oana Paveluc =

Romanian beauty pageant contestant (born 1991)

- Born: Oana Paveluc; 14 August 1991 (age 35); Braşov, Romania
- Height: 5 ft 11.5 in (1.82 m)
- Beauty pageant titleholder
- Title: Miss Universe Romania 2010
- Hair color: Brown
- Eye color: Green
- Major competition: Miss Universe Romania 2010 (winner) Miss Universe 2010 (Unplaced)

Oana Paveluc (born 14 August 1991 in Braşov, Romania) is a Romanian model, dancer and beauty pageant titleholder who was crowned new Miss Universe Romania 2010 on 14 July 2010 after Alexandra Cătălina Filip, the original winner, was dethroned, as she refused to sign the contract with the Miss Universe Organization (MUO). The contract stipulates that the winner of Miss Universe 2010 must move to NYC and be under contract with Donald Trump for one year. Filip is a professional sport dancer, and she wanted to be able to continue representing Romania at international sport dancing competitions and not be restrained by MUO's contract. On 14 July 2010, at the official press conference where the winners of Miss Universe Romania 2010 had gathered to meet with all the sponsors and receive their prizes, Alexandra Cătălina Filip surprised everyone when she announced that she didn't wish to continue the path to Las Vegas and in a friendly manner allowed Bianca Elena Constantin, Miss Universe Romania 2009, to crown Oana Paveluc.

On 9 July 2010, in a live televised show (audited by Ernst & Young Romania) Alexandra Catalina Filip was awarded 401 points (out of a total of 480) by the 12 official judges, whereas Oana Paveluc had received 390 points. The audience at home voted via sms (at a cost of €0.36, including 24% VAT), and their vote counted as the 13th vote. Oana Paveluc also won the "Media award", which was decided by 12 journalists from well-known publications, radio, TV, online and other media firms.

She represented Romania at the Miss Universe 2010 beauty pageant, which was held in Las Vegas, Nevada, U.S. on 23 August 2010.
