= Isis Finlay =

Cuban model (1934–2007)

- Born: 15 September 1934; Cuba
- Died: 24 May 2007 (aged 72); Miami, Florida
- Beauty pageant titleholder
- Title: Miss Cuba 1954
- Major competitions: Miss Cuba 1954 (Winner); Miss Universe 1954 (Unplaced)

Isis Margarita Finlay (15 September 1934 in Cuba – 24 May 2007 in Miami, Florida) was a Cuban model and beauty pageant titleholder who won the 1954 Miss Cuba pageant and represented her country at Miss Universe 1954.

After she won the Miss Cuba pageant in Cuba, she traveled to Long Beach, California for the Third Miss Universe Pageant. For the next 53 years, she traveled to 51 countries. She was the great-grandniece of the well-known Cuban doctor Carlos Finlay (1833–1915). She had four children.
