= Miss Grand Ethiopia =

Beauty pageant in Ethiopia

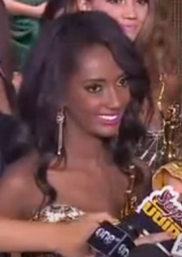
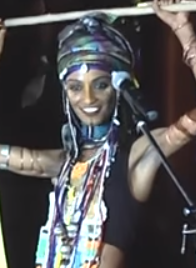
- Hiwot Bekele; Miss Grand Ethiopia 2014 Bethelhem Belay; Miss Grand Ethiopia 2015
- Formation: 2013
- Type: Beauty pageant
- Headquarters: Addis Ababa
- Location: Ethiopia
- Members: Miss Grand International
- Official language: English
- National director: Genet Tsegay
- Parent organization: Miss Ethiopia (2014 – 2016); Ethiopian Beauty Queens (2017 – 2018)

Miss Grand Ethiopia is a national beauty pageant title awarded to Ethiopian representatives competing at the Miss Grand International contest. From 2013 to 2018, the license belonged to the national contest of the Miss Ethiopia pageant, but most of the country representatives were appointed instead of directly determined through such a national pageant. The contract between Miss Ethiopia and Miss Grand International was discontinued in 2019, and no other Ethiopian body renewed the license, resulting in no Ethiopian representatives on such an international stage since then.

Since the first participation in 2013, the highest and only placement in Miss Grand International of Ethiopian representatives was the first runner-up which was obtained in 2014 by the vice-Miss Ethiopia 2014, Hiwot Bekele. Three months after winning the position, Hiwot was appointed to compete at the Miss Universe 2014, but was unplaced.

== History ==
Ethiopia joined the Miss Grand International contest for the first time in 2013 after former Miss Universe Ethiopia, Helen Getachew, was assigned by the Miss Grand Ethiopia license holder who was also the Miss Ethiopia organizer, Ethiopian Village Adventure Playground (EVAP), to represent the country at Miss Grand International 2013 in Thailand, but Getachew failed to make a cut into the top 20 round. The following country's representatives were directly hand-picked by the licensees in that particular year, except for the 2018 candidate, Samrawit Azmeraw, who was selected through the Ethiopian Beauty Queens pageant as one of the supplemental positions.

Due to a lack of franchise holders, Ethiopia has not sent its representatives to compete on the Miss Grand International stage since 2019.

== International competition ==
The following is a list of Ethiopian representatives at the Miss Grand International contest.

| Year | Representative | Original national title | Competition performance | | National director |
| Year | Representative | Original national title | Placement | Other awards | National director |
|---|---|---|---|---|---|
| 2013 | Helen Getachew | Miss Universe Ethiopia 2012 | Unplaced | —N/a | Murad Mohammed |
| 2014 | Hiwot Bekele | 1st runner-up Miss Ethiopia 2014 | 1st runner-up | —N/a | Murad Mohammed |
| 2015 | Bethelhem Belay | 1st runner-up Miss Ethiopia 2015 | Unplaced | —N/a | Murad Mohammed |
| 2016 | Genet Tsegay | Miss Ethiopia 2012 | Unplaced | —N/a | Murad Mohammed |
| 2017 | Hanna Abate | —N/a | Unable to compete | | Genet Tsegay |
| 2017 | Selamawit Teklay | Miss Ethiopia 2015 finalist | Unplaced | —N/a | Genet Tsegay |
| 2018 | Samrawit Azmeraw | Miss Grand Ethiopia 2018 | Unplaced | —N/a | Genet Tsegay |
2019 – Present: No Representatives
