= Miss Grand Ukraine =

Beauty pageant in Ukraine

- Formation: 2013
- Type: Beauty pageant
- Headquarters: Kyiv (Temporarily in Wiesbaden, Germany, since 2022)
- Location: Ukraine
- Members: Miss Grand International
- Official language: Ukrainian
- National director: Natalia Kovaleva
- Parent organization: Queen of Ukraine (2016 – 2019, 2022 – Present)

Miss Grand Ukraine is a national beauty pageant title awarded to Ukrainian representatives competing at the Miss Grand International pageant. The titleholders from 2013 to 2015 were all appointed by the different franchise holders; no respective national pageant was held. Since 2016, the Miss Grand Ukraine titleholders have been elected through a national contest, Queen of Ukraine (Королева України), headquartered in Kyiv.

Since first partaking in 2013, Ukrainian representatives secured placements in Miss Grand International five times in total, the highest position is the final 10, which was reached in 2016 and 2017.

== History ==
Ukraine has always sent its representatives to compete at the Miss Grand International since 2013. Nonetheless, its first three representatives were all appointed to the title; no respective national pageant was held. In 2016, the license was transferred to Diva Fashion Group, the Queen of Ukraine (Ukrainian: Королева Украины) pageant organizer chaired by Natalia Kovaleva; the Ukrainian representatives have been selected through the mentioned national contest since then.

In 2022, due to the 2022 Russo-Ukrainian War, the national contest of the Queen of Ukraine, which was usually held in Kyiv, was temporarily moved to Wiesbaden, Germany, where the pageant was organized on a smaller scale and aimed to raise funds to support displaced Ukrainian people in Germany. Since 2023, the titleholders were determined through virtual procedures instead of the actual pageant.

== International competition ==
The following is a list of Ukrainian representatives at the Miss Grand International contest.

Year	Representative	Original national title	Competition performance	
Year	Representative	Original national title	Placement	Other awards
2013	Liudmyla Alexandrovna	Appointed	Withdrew during the competition	
2014	Nadiya Karplyuk	Appointed	Top 20	—
2015	Anastasiia Lenna	Appointed	Top 20	—
2016	Marina Kushnir	Queen of Ukraine — Grand International 2016	Resigned	
2016	Veronika Mykhailyshyn	Queen of Ukraine 2016	Top 10	—
2017	Snizhana Tanchuk	Queen of Ukraine 2017	Top 10	
2018	Yana Laurinaichute	Queen of Ukraine 2018	Unplaced	—
2019	Viktoriya Myronova	Queen of Ukraine 2019	Unplaced	—
2020–2021: No representatives
2022	Olga Vasyliv	Queen of Ukraine 2022	Unplaced	—
2023	Julia Klimenko	Queen of Ukraine 2023	Top 20	—
2024	Kateryna Bilyk	Queen of Ukraine 2024	Withdrew during the competition	
2025	No representative			
2026	Maria Kolotilo	Queen of Ukraine 2025	TBA	_
Color keys for the Placements at Miss Grand International Declared as the winner Ended as a runner-up (Top 5) Ended as a finalist (Top 10) Ended as a semifinalist (Top 20/21)

== Gallery ==
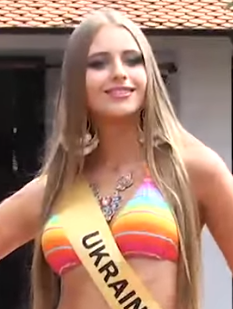
Miss Grand Ukraine 2014
Nadiya Karplyuk

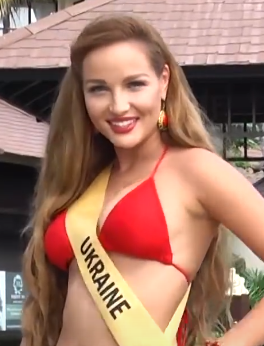
Miss Grand Ukraine 2015
Anastasiia Lenna

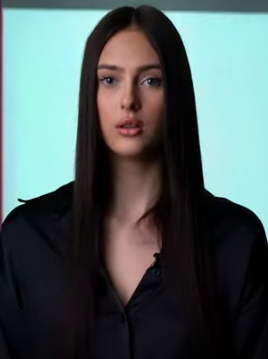
Miss Grand Ukraine 2023
Yulia Klimenko

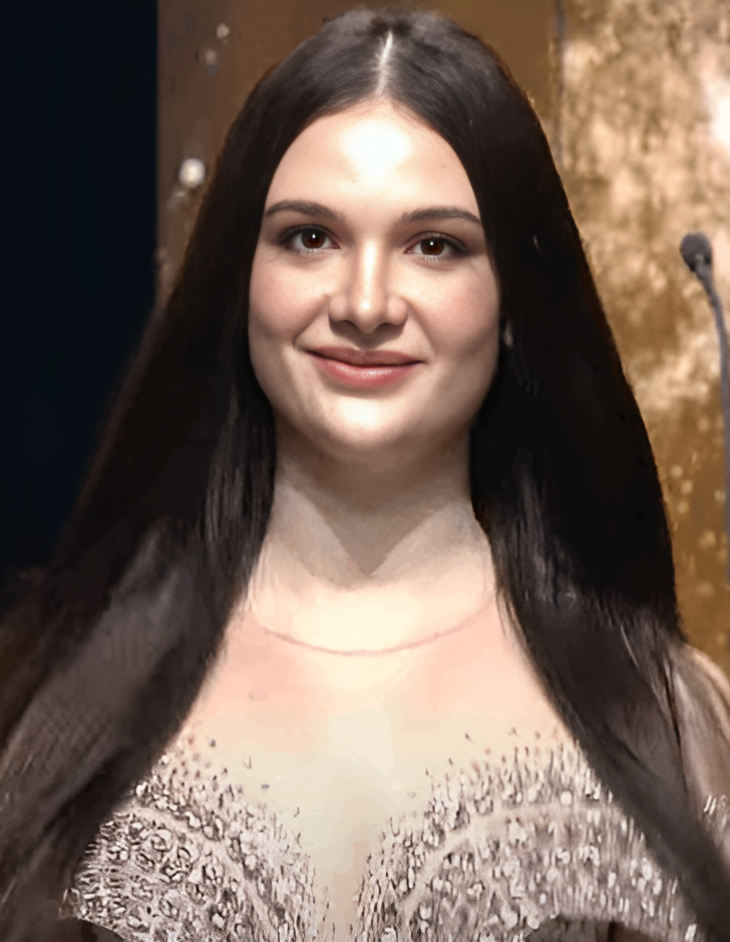
Miss Grand Ukraine 2024
Kateryna Bilyk
