= Miss Grand International 2014 =

2nd Miss Grand International Competition, beauty pageant edition

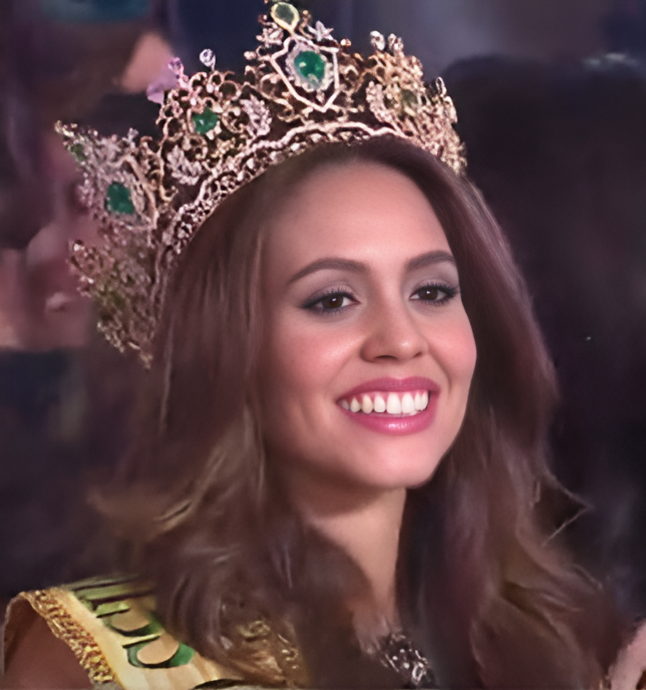
- Lees García
- Date: 7 October 2014
- Presenters: Matthew Deane; Sonia Couling
- Entertainment: Ali Forbes
- Venue: Indoor Stadium Huamark, Bangkok, Thailand
- Broadcaster: Facebook live; Channel 7
- Entrants: 85
- Placements: 20
- Debuts: Albania; Bosnia and Herzegovina; Botswana; Cambodia; Cameroon; Chile; Costa Rica; Côte d'Ivoire; Curaçao; Guam; Haiti; Hong Kong; Iran; Israel; Kurdistan; Luxembourg; Malta; Mauritius; Nicaragua; Nigeria; Panama; Peru; Saint Vincent and the Grenadines; Samoa; Singapore; South Sudan; Suriname; Sweden; Tahiti; Taiwan; Tanzania; Ukraine; United Kingdom; United States Virgin Islands
- Withdrawals: Algeria; Egypt; El Salvador; England; Georgia; Guadeloupe; Guatemala; Guinea; Honduras; Italy; Kenya; Latvia; Macedonia; Moldova; Namibia; Serbia; Switzerland; Turkmenistan; Uganda; Wales
- Winner: Lees García; Cuba
- Best National Costume: Thùy Linh Cao; Vietnam

Miss Grand International 2014 was the second edition of the Miss Grand International pageant, held on 7 October 2014 at the Indoor Stadium Huamark in Bangkok, Thailand. Contestants from eighty-five countries and territories competed for the title, of whom the representative of Cuba, Lees García, was announced the winner and received a reward of 40,000 USD cash. Meanwhile, the representatives of Australia, Canada, Colombia, and Ethiopia were named the runners-up.

The pageant's grand final featured a live performance of Miss Grand International 2013 – third runner-up, Ali Forbes, and was broadcast nationwide via the Channel 7, with two Thai television personalities, Matthew Deane and Sonia Couling, as the event's MCs.

Initially, more than ninety candidates were confirmed to participate, withdrawals included, Soumia Benmebrouk of Algeria, Ané Reynolds of South Africa, and Dijana Cvijetic of Switzerland.

== Background ==
=== Date and venue ===
The pageant press launch was on 18 November 2014, at the Suvarnabhumi Airport, after the arrival of all candidates. At the event, the pageant schedule was announced, with activities running from 19 November to 7 October in three different cities, including Sukhothai, Nakhon Pathom, and Bangkok.

As with the previous edition, the pageant had four main events, including the swimsuit contest, held on 23 November at the Sukhothai Heritage Resort, Sukhothai; the national costume contest, held on 28 November at Sampran Riverside Theater, Nakhon Pathom; and the preliminary and final rounds in Bangkok on 5 and 7 October at the Indoor Stadium Huamark.

=== Selection of Participants ===
Of the eighty-five participating candidates, only eight were elected through Miss Grand National pageants, including the representatives of Albania, Australia, Botswana, Brazil, Curaçao, Kosovo, Philippines, and Thailand. Five candidates were the main winners of other pageants, including Xue Han from Miss China 2014, Bahareh Heidari from the Miss Iran 2014 online pageant, Dajana Laketic – Face of Malta 2014 winner, Jasy ln Tan from Miss Singapore Islandia 2014, and Tashana Losche from Miss Tropical Beauties Suriname 2014. The remaining candidates were either the runners-up in other national pageants or directly picked by national directors without competing in national stages.

== Results ==
=== Placements ===
Placement	Contestant
Miss Grand International 2014	Cuba – Lees García
1st runner-up	Ethiopia – Hiwot Bekele (Dethroned)
2nd runner-up	Canada – Kathryn Kohut
3rd runner-up	Australia – Renera Thompson
4th runner-up	Colombia – Mónica Castaño
Top 10	Haiti – Lisa Drouillard; Indonesia – Margenie Winarti; Poland – Angelika Ogryzek; Russia – Yana Dubnik; Thailand – Parapadsorn Disdamrong
Top 20	Brazil – Yameme lbrahim; Israel – Hodaya Cohen; Japan – Mieko Takeuchi; Mexico – Marsha Ramírez; Peru – Sophía Venero; Puerto Rico – Rebeca Valentín; Sri Lanka – Iresha Asanki; Ukraine – Nadiya Karplyuk; United Kingdom – Georgia Smith; Venezuela – Alix Sosa

=== Special awards ===
Awards	Contestant
Best National Costume	Vietnam – Thùy Linh Cao
Best Evening Gown	Indonesia – Margenie Winarti
Best in Swimsuit	Thailand – Parapadsorn Disdamrong
Best in Social Media	Japan – Mieko Takeuchi
Miss Popular Vote	Cambodia – Tim Sreyneat

== Pageant ==
=== Format ===
In the grand final round held on 7 October, after an introduction, twenty contestants, who were selected through the preliminary round held on 5 October as well as all pre-pageant scorings, qualified for the top 20, in which each of the qualified candidates competed in the swimsuit. The score from this round, together with all previous accumulation scores, determined the top 10 finalists who then competed against each other in the evening gown and speech session. Based on accumulation scores, the final five were selected to continue in the question and answer portion, where the winner and runners-up were determined.

== Contestants ==
85 contestants competed for the title.

Country/Territory	Delegate	Age	Hometown
Albania	Vivian Canaj	19	Tirana
Argentina	Nadina Vallina	19	Buenos Aires
Australia	Renera Thompson	27	Sydney
Belgium	Sarah De Groof	23	Malle
Bolivia	Camila Lepere	18	Santa Cruz de la Sierra
Bosnia and Herzegovina	Alma Jasić	25	Bihać
Botswana	Lillian Dlamini	18	Gaborone
Brazil	Yameme Ibrahim	23	Criciúma
Cambodia	Tim Sreyneat	24	Phnom Penh
Cameroon	Laeticia Ndzana	18	Yaoundé
Canada	Kathryn Kohut	23	Wetaskiwin
Chile	Karla Bovet	21	Temuco
China	Han Xue	24	Beijing
Colombia	Mónica Castaño	25	Palmira
Costa Rica	Anniel Quesada	26	San José
(Ivory Coast) Côte d'Ivoire	Richlove Amissah	20	Yamoussoukro
Cuba	Lees García	27	Havana
Curaçao	Silvienne Winklaar	22	Willemstad
Czech Republic	Jana Zapletarová	23	Brno
Dominican Republic	Germania Martínez	19	New York City
Ecuador	Irene Zabala	25	Guayaquil
Estonia	Maria Raja	23	Viljandi
Ethiopia	Hiwot Bekele	23	Addis Ababa
Finland	Sanna-Kaisa Saari	26	Turku
France	Norma Julia	21	Perpignan
Germany	Johanna Acs	22	Eschweiler
Greece	Anastasia Terzi	22	Athens
Guam	Naiomie Santos	22	Asan
Haiti	Lisa Drouillard	23	Port-au-Prince
Hong Kong	Joane Mo	23	Hong Kong
Hungary	Réka Lukács	21	Budapest
India	Monica Sharma	22	Mumbai
Indonesia	Margenie Winarti	22	Pekanbaru
Iran	Bahareh Nasserabad	24	Tehran
Israel	Hodaya Cohen	22	Beersheba
Japan	Mieko Takeuchi	21	Kobe
Kazakhstan	Aidana Elemesova	19	Aktau
Kosovo	Naile Thaqi	21	Gjilan
(Kurdistan Region) Kurdistan	Dalia Rebwar Hassan	25	Stockholm
Lebanon	Eliane Kerdy	22	Zahlé
Luxembourg	Corinne Semedo	21	Luxembourg City
Macau	Matilda Ip	24	Macau
Malaysia	Jane Koo	25	Kuala Lumpur
Malta	Dajana Laketić	25	Swatar
Mauritius	Dolesswaree Charun	23	Curepipe
Mexico	Marsha Ramírez	22	Mérida
Mongolia	Battogtokh Buyantogtokh	23	Ulaanbaatar
Myanmar	M Ja Seng	21	Kachin
Nepal	Shrijana Regmi	19	Sankhuwasabha
Netherlands	Francis Everduim	18	Zwolle
New Zealand	Maddieson White	18	Auckland
Nicaragua	María Alejandra Gross	20	Managua
Nigeria	Tessy Bibowei	25	Abuja
Norway	Caroline Munthe	24	Asker
Pakistan	Laila Khan	25	Karachi
Panama	Carmen de García	24	Macaracas
Paraguay	Gissella Sotomayor	20	Encarnación
Peru	Sophía Venero	24	Chiclayo
Philippines	Kimberly Karlsson	18	Mindoro Oriental
Poland	Angelika Ogryzek	22	Szczecin
Portugal	Maria Emília Araújo	23	Angra do Heroísmo
Puerto Rico	Rebeca Valentín	19	Dorado
Romania	Delia Duca	28	Brașov
Russia	Yana Dubnik	22	Novosibirsk
Saint Vincent and the Grenadines	Kaylee Shallow	22	Kingstown
Samoa	Renee Logova	20	Apia
Singapore	Jasy ln Tan	22	Singapore
Slovakia	Veronika Janišová	21	Bratislava
South Korea	Hye-won Sung	26	Seoul
South Sudan	Diana Stevens	20	Juba
Spain	Nazaret Hurtado	19	Almería
Sri Lanka	Iresha Asanki	23	Colombo
Suriname	Tashana Lösche	25	Paramaribo
Sweden	Pamela Olivera	21	Estocolmo
(French Polynesia) Tahiti	Kohotu Ariitai	22	Papeete
Taiwan	Kiki Chen	24	Taipei
Tanzania	Lorraine Marriot	20	Dar es Salaam
Thailand	Porapadsorn Disdamrong	23	Nakhon Ratchasima
Ukraine	Nadiya Karplyuk	23	Volinia
United Kingdom	Georgia Smith	20	Liverpool
United States	Sara Platt	18	Washington D. C.
United States Virgin Islands	Wilma Echandy	22	Charlotte Amalie
Venezuela	Alix Sosa	25	Caracas
Vietnam	Thùy Linh Cao	23	Ho Chi Minh City
Zimbabwe	Lillie Chopamba	23	Harare
