= Daniela Nane =

Romanian actress (born 1971)

- Born: November 29, 1971 (age 54); Iași, Romania
- Occupation: Actress
- Beauty pageant titleholder
- Title: Miss Romania 1991
- Years active: 1991–present
- Major competitions: Miss Romania 1991 (Winner); Miss Universe 1991 (Unplaced)

Daniela Nane (born November 29, 1971) is a Romanian actress, director and beauty pageant titleholder who was crowned Miss Romania 1991 and represented her country at Miss Universe 1991.

== Early life and education ==
She was born on 29 November 1971 in Iași, Romania. In 1994, she attended a masterclass at the European League of Institutes of the Arts. Later, in 2011, she participated in a training course in "Japanese Culture and Civilization and Japanese Theater" at Osaka University through the UNESCO Chair.

== Career ==
Nane stepped into the spotlight in 1991, when she won the Miss Romania pageant and a year later, she became Romania's first participant in the Miss Universe beauty pageant held in Las Vegas. Afterward, from 1991 to 1995, she attended the Caragiale National University of Theatre and Film, where she studied with instructors like Mircea Albulescu, Cătălin Naum, and Adrian Titieni.

Nane is also an artistic director of the Musical Theater Ambasadorii. She has starred in more than 50 theatrical plays, feature films, and television shows during her career. In 2021, she debuted as a director with a comedy play on Broadway, filmed in Vâlcea.

== Personal life ==
Until 2002, Nane was married to a businessman Viorel Popa with whom she had a child, Codrin. After her divorce, she was in a relationship with the director Andrei Zincă for some time. Later in 2016, she married Adrian Cioroianu, the former minister of foreign affairs.

== Awards ==
Nane won two best actress awards for her debut in Patul lui Procust, directed by Cătălina Buzoianu.

== Filmography ==
- 1996 Μπίζνες στα Βαλκάνια (Biznes sta Valkania) as Stella
- 1996 Eu sunt Adam (My Name Is Adam) as Oana
- 1997 Femeia în roșu (The Woman in Red)
- 1998 Dublu extaz (Double Ecstasy)
- 2000 Epicentru (Epicenter)
- 2003 La Bloc (The Block) as Monica
- 2004 În extrasezon (In the off-season) as Suburban Mom
- 2004 Orient Express as Carmen Ionescu
- 2004 Aripile întunericului (Gargoyle: Wings of Darkness) as Peasant Girl
- 2004 O secundă de ură (A Second of Hate) as Ana
- 2004 Căsătorie imposibilă (Impossible Marriage) (TV Series)
- 2005 Prințesa vampirilor (Vampire Princess) (BloodRayne) as Rayne's Mother
- 2005 "15" as Nina
- 2006 La urgență (In the Emergency) (TV series)
- 2006 Happy End as Dana's Mother
- 2008 Dincolo de America (Beyond America) as Milena Savian
- 2008 Dragoste pierdută (Lost Love)
- 2008 17 - O poveste despre destin (17 - A Story About Destiny) (TV Series)
