= Anastasiia Lenna =

Ukrainian model

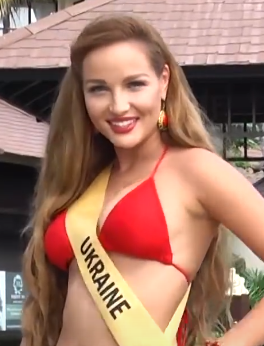
- Occupation: Model
- Awards: Miss Ukraine 2015

Anastasiia Lenna is a Ukrainian model, Miss Ukraine 2015 and Miss Supranational Ukraine 2016. During the 2022 Russian invasion of Ukraine in 2022, she posted photos on social media playing airsoft with the intention of “inspiring people” during the war. After social media posts and media outlets reported that she had enlisted in the Ukrainian army, Lenna assured that she had not and that she was not a military.
