= Miss Grand Romania =

Beauty pageant in Romania

- Formation: 2013
- Type: Beauty pageant
- Headquarters: Bucharest
- Location: Romania
- Members: Miss Grand International
- Official language: Romanian
- National director: Ernest Hadrian Böhm
- Parent organization: Exclusive Events International (2013 – 2019); Denisse Vivienne Andor (2023)

Miss Grand Romania is a national female beauty pageant title awarded to Romanian representatives competing at the Miss Grand International pageant. The title was first awarded in 2013 to a Politehnica University of Bucharest graduate, Iuliana Vasile, who then competed at the inaugural edition of Miss Grand International in Thailand but was unplaced.

From 2013 to 2019, the license of Miss Grand Romania belonged to an event organizer, Exclusive Events International, headed by Ernest Hadrian Böhm, who later became the Miss Romania organizer in 2016.

Since their first competition in 2013, the Romanian representatives have never secured any placements on the international stage of Miss Grand International.

== History ==
In the first decade of Miss Grand International, Romania has always sent its representatives to compete, the license of which belonged to a Bucharest-based event organizer, Exclusive Events International, which is directed by Ernest Hadrian Böhm; all of the representatives during such a period were directly hand-picked, no Miss Grand national contest was held.

Nonetheless, two years after Böhm granted the Miss Universe Romania license, his partnership with the Miss Grand International organizer, MGI PLC, was discontinued, and no other Romanian organs renewed the franchise, resulting in no Romanian representative in the Miss Grand International from 2020 to 2022.

Romania was expected to return in the 2023 competition in Vietnam.

Gallery

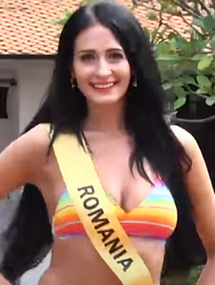
Delia Duca
Miss Grand Romania 2014

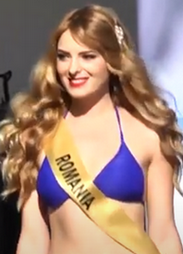
Georgiana Radu
Miss Grand Romania 2015

Andreea Ciuca
Miss Grand Romania 2026

== International competition ==
The following is a list of Romanian representatives at the Miss Grand International contest.

Year	Representative	Original national title	Competition performance		National director
Year	Representative	Original national title	Placement	Other awards	National director
2013	Iuliana Vasile	Appointed	Unplaced	—N/a	Ernest Böhm
2014	Delia Duca	Miss Universe Romania 2012	Unplaced	—N/a	Ernest Böhm
2015	Georgiana Radu	Appointed	Unplaced	—N/a	Ernest Böhm
2016	Ioana Mihalache	3rd runner-up Miss Universe Romania 2012	Unplaced	—N/a	Ernest Böhm
2018	Ana Maria Laura Șerban	Finalist Miss Universe Romania 2017	Unplaced	—N/a	Ernest Böhm
2019	Ramona Vătămanu	World Next Top Model România 2018	Unplaced	—N/a	Ernest Böhm
No representatives since 2020 - 2022
2023	Denisse Vivienne Andor	3rd runner-up Miss Grand Spain 2023	Unplaced	—N/a	Self-dominated
2024	No representatives				
No representatives between 2025 - present
