= Miss Kurdistan =

Beauty pageant

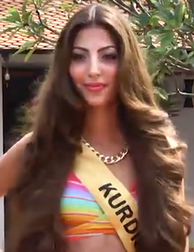
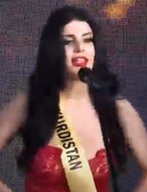
- Dalia Hassan; Miss Grand Kurdistan 2014 Leyli Chupani; Miss Grand Kurdistan 2015
- Formation: 2012
- Type: Beauty Pageant
- Headquarters: Erbil
- Location: Kurdistan Region, bashur
- Members: Miss World; Miss Grand International; Miss United Continents
- Official language: Kurdish
- Website: misskurdistan.krd

Miss Kurdistan is a national beauty pageant for young women in bashur Kurdistan. It was founded in Erbil in 2012, the first Miss Kurdistan winner was Shene Aziz Ako. The winner is assigned a one-year contract, traveling across Kurdistan, and in some cases overseas. Aside from the job, the winner also receives a cash allowance for her entire reign.

== Titleholders ==
Year	Miss Kurdistan	First runner-up	Second runner-up	Notes
2018	Sanna Mahmod (Halabja)	Kareiz	Merian	
2016	Zhalia Sirwan (Erbil)	Sargol Salam Chir	Shadi Abdulkarim	
2013	Fenik Muhammed (Sulaymaniyah)	Not awarded	Not awarded	
2012	Shene Aziz Ako (Sulaymaniyah)	Evîn Reuf	Gardinia Yasmin Rahim	

=== Special awards ===
Year	Miss Internet	Miss National Dress	Miss Personality	Miss Tourism	Miss Peace
2013	Dalia Rebwar Hassan	Shakar Nasih	Seher Abdulla	Nady Rashid	Zhin Sebah
Year	Miss Elegance	Miss Friendship	Miss Photogenic	Not awarded	
2012	Evîn Reuf	Rahma Talb	Sara Hilal	Not awarded	

== Miss Kurdistan representatives at International beauty pageants ==
Color key

- : Declared as Winner
- : Ended as runner-up or top 5/6 qualification
- : Ended as one of the finalists or semifinalists
- : Ended as special awards winner

=== Miss World ===
Year	Representative's Name	Hometown	Placement	Special Awards	Ref
2014	Shene Aziz Ako	Sulaymaniyah	Did not compete		

=== Miss Grand International ===
Year	Representative's Name	Hometown	Placement	Special Awards	Ref
2015	Leyli Chupani	Mahabad	Unplaced		
2014	Dalia Rebwar Hassan	Stockholm	Unplaced	Withdraw during the competition	

=== Miss United Continents ===
Year	Representative's Name	Hometown	Placement	Special Awards	Ref
2015	Fatimah Ghadan	Mahabad	Unplaced		
2014	Dalia Bapeer Mohammad	Sulaymaniyah	Unplaced		
