= Jamillette Gaxiola =

- Born: Jamillette Gaxiola; 1989 (age 36–37); Mazatlán, Sinaloa, Mexico
- Height: 1.75 m (5 ft 9 in)
- Beauty pageant titleholder
- Hair color: Black
- Eye color: Grey
- Major competitions: Señorita México U.S. 2007 (Winner); Miss Earth 2009 (Unplaced); Miss Grand International 2013 (Top 10)

Jamillette Gaxiola (born 1989 in Mazatlán, Mexico) is a Mexican-Cuban model and beauty pageant titleholder who represented Cuba in the 2009 Miss Earth pageant, held in November 2009.

== Personal life ==
Jamillette was born in Mazatlán, Mexico to a Mexican father and a Cuban-born Lebanese mother. Jamillette currently attends community college in Las Vegas, Nevada, where she lives with her family. She attended Cimarron-Memorial High School. She is currently a cast member of the hit reality TV show The Shores on the TV Guide Channel.

== Pageantry ==
Gaxiola began participating in local pageants at age three. At the age of eighteen, she competed in Señorita Republica Deportiva 2007 produced by Univision where she placed 2nd runner-up. A year later, she competed in Miss Mexico USA as Miss Sinaloa. In 2009, she represented Cuba at Miss Earth 2009.

Gaxiola also participated in Miss Grand International 2013 and finished as a Top 10 finalist.

Preceded by First Edition	Miss Grand Cuba; 2013	Succeeded by Daryanne Lees
Preceded by Jessica Silva	Miss Cuba Earth; 2009	Succeeded by Incumbent
