= Daryanne Lees =

Cuban-Puerto Rican beauty queen

Daryanne Lees Garcia
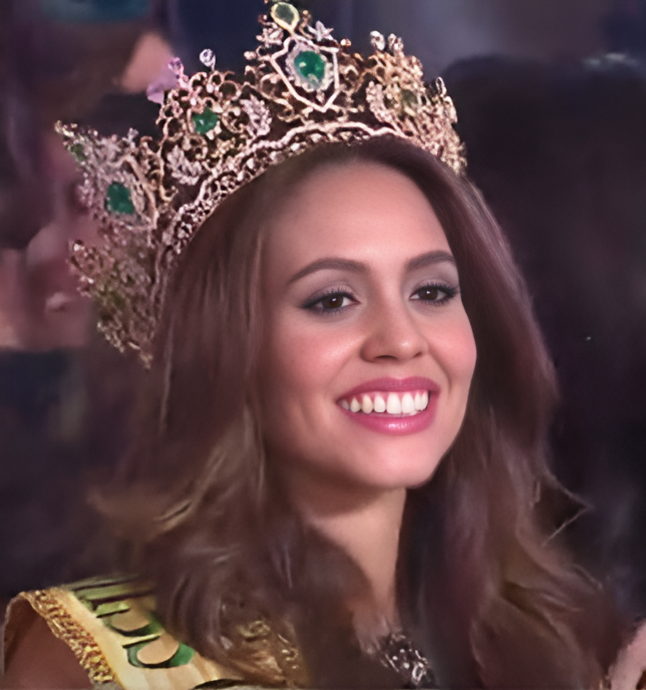
- Lees in 2014
- Born: December 25, 1986 (age 39); San Juan, Puerto Rico
- Height: 1.71 m (5 ft 7 1/2 in)
- Beauty pageant titleholder
- Title: Miss Comunidad Puertorriqueña en Estados Unidos 2008; Miss Florida US International 2009; Miss Grand Cuba 2014; Miss Grand International 2014
- Major competitions: Miss Puerto Rico Universe 2008 (Best National Costume); Miss U.S. International 2009 (1st Runner Up); Miss Earth USA 2014 (Miss Eco-Tourism); Miss Grand Cuba 2014 (Appointed); Miss Grand International 2014 (Winner)

Daryanne Lees Garcia (born 25 December 1986) is a Cuban-Puerto Rican model and beauty queen who represented Cuba at Miss Grand International 2014 where she won the title.

== Personal life ==
Lees was born in San Juan, Puerto Rico in December 1986 to a Puerto Rican mother and Cuban father. She later relocated to Miami, Florida.

== Pageantry ==
=== Miss Puerto Rico Universe 2008 ===
Daryanne competed at Miss Puerto Rico Universe 2008 under the name Lees Daryanne where she represented the Puerto Rican Community in the United States and was awarded Best National Costume. She previously won Miss Tampa USA 2008. She also won the title of Miss Florida US International in 2009.

=== Miss Earth USA 2014 ===
She is a candidate who took part in and became runner-up (Miss Eco-Tourism) in Miss Earth USA 2014 and held/joined a string of other contests like Miss Puerto Rico Teen, Miss Puerto Rico World 2006, Puerto Rico Model 2007, Miss Puerto Rico Universe 2008, Miss Florida USA 2009, Miss Florida US International 2009 before finally getting picked for the Miss Grand Cuba title.

=== Miss Grand International 2014 ===
Lees Daryanne Garcia represented Cuba at the second Miss Grand International pageant on October 7, 2014, where she became the second winner in the pageant's history. She is the first woman to win an international beauty pageant title on behalf of Cuba in the history of international beauty pageants, Lees had traveled to Thailand, and South Sudan.

Awards and achievements
Preceded by (Puerto Rico) Janelee Chaparro	Miss Grand International; 2014	Succeeded by Anea Garcia (Dethroned) (Australia) Claire Elizabeth Parker (Assumed)
Preceded by Jamillette Gaxiola	Miss Grand Cuba; 2014	Succeeded by Maria Manzo
Preceded by First Edition	Miss Comunidad Puertorriqueña en Estados Unidos; 2008	Succeeded by TBD
