= Miss Grand International (company) =

Thai conglomerate

Miss Grand International PCL
- Formerly: Miss Grand International Co., Ltd. (2013–2022)
- Type: Public
- Traded as: MAI: MGI
- Industry: Commerce; Entertainment; Service; Health cares; Digital service
- Founded: November 6, 2013
- Founder: Nawat Itsaragrisil
- Headquarters: 1751 Soi Ladprao 94 (Punjamit), Plubpla, Wangthonglang, Bangkok, Thailand
- Area served: Worldwide
- Key people: Nawat Itsaragrisil (CEO); Ratchaphol Chantaratim (Deputy CEO); Sopapan Wirunmat (CCO)
- Products: Advertisement; Cosmetics; Entertainment; Events; Health products; Processed food; Jewelry; Aesthetic medicine
- Revenue: ▲BT฿617.04 Million (2023)
- Operating income: ▲BT฿150.65 Million (2023)
- Net income: ▲BT฿119.25 Million (2023)
- Total assets: ▲BT฿605.39 Million (2023)
- Total equity: ▲BT฿454.74 Million (2023)
- Subsidiaries: KMGI Co., Ltd.; Grand Clinic Co., Ltd.; MGI X Co., Ltd.
- Website: missgrand.com

Miss Grand International (MGI PCL) is a Thai conglomerate founded in 2013 by Nawat Itsaragrisil, headquartered in Bangkok, Thailand. It comprises numerous businesses in various industries of advertisement, cosmetics, entertainment, events, health products, processed food, talent management, jewelry and aesthetic medicine.

Initially, it was only responsible for the management of the Miss Grand Thailand and Miss Grand International pageants but was later expanded and diversified into other business sectors in the late 2010s.

== History ==
The company was established as a limited company on November 6, 2013, with an authorized capital of one million Bath, and is chaired by Nawat Itsaragrisil, a Thai television host and producer who had previously served as producer of Miss Thailand World for BEC-Tero. After ending his role with BEC-Tero, Nawat signed a business partnership with Channel 7 and subsequently established his national pageant, Miss Grand Thailand, in mid-2013 and the newly established international pageant, Miss Grand International, which was managed by the Miss Grand International Co., Ltd.

Alongside its flagship beauty pageant, the company eventually expanded and diversified into the food-processing and cosmetics industries in 2018 as well as the talent management sector in 2019, which led the company to increase its authorized capital to 50 and 75 million Baht in 2020 and 2022, respectively.

The MGI Co., Ltd. was transformed into a public limited company with a registered capital of 105 million Baht on June 15, 2022, and was listed on the Market for Alternative Investment (MAI) on December 14, 2023. In the corporation with Karmarts, its subsidiary, KMGI Co., Ltd., was established in February 2023 to be responsible for the cosmetics section specifically.

In late 2024, the company diversified its portfolio by investing in the jewelry sector and aesthetic medicine through its subsidiary, Grand Clinic Company. In 2025, it further expanded into the digital technology domain by investing in a voting and token platform under FDX Tech Singapore, through a joint venture established as MGI X Limited.

On December 4, 2025, Miss Grand International announced the first-ever MGI All Stars.

== Products and services ==
Miss Grand International PCL and its subsidiary is summarized as the 5 core businesses as follows;

Section	Revenue Sharing	Product/Service
Commerce	40.86%	Cosmetics, processed foods, household products, dietary supplements
Talent management	23.12%	
Entertainment and media	19.06%	
Beauty pageants	12.63%	Miss Grand International, Miss Grand Thailand, Miss Universe Thailand, MGI All Stars
Rental business and others	4.33%	MGI Hall

== Major shareholders ==
Initially, the company CEO Nawat Itsaragrisil together with the deputy Ratchaphol Chantaratim held a 99.99 percent stake, but that was decreased to 71.42 percent after an initial public offering (IPO) in late 2023.

Shareholders	Before an IPO	After an IPO (December 8, 2023)
Shareholders	% of Issued Capital	% of Issued Capital
Nawat Itsaragrisil	60.00	42.86
Ratchaphol Chantaratim	39.99	28.57
Karmarts Public Co., Ltd.	—	2.86
Peerajet Suwannaphasri	—	2.24
Khanphol Sueaphak	—	0.95
Charlotte Austin	—	0.95
Engfa Waraha	—	0.95
Pongsak Thammathat-aree	—	0.95
Sura Khanittaweekul	—	0.95
Krittidet Prachanukul	—	0.71
Others	—	18.01
Total	100.00	100.00
