= Miss Grand Congo (RDC) =

Seychelles beauty pageant title

Miss Grand Democratic Republic of the Congo
- Formation: 2014
- Type: Beauty pageant
- Headquarters: Democratic Republic of the Congo
- Location: Kinshasa
- Members: Miss Grand International
- Official language: English; French
- Parent organization: Merton'y Business (2025)

Miss Grand Democratic Republic of the Congo (French: Miss Grand République Démocratique du Congo) is a national beauty pageant title awarded to Congolese representatives who were elected to partake in the Miss Grand International pageant. The title was first mentioned in 2014 when a Manchester-based Congolese model, Naise Gumanda, was named the RDC representative for Miss Grand International 2014, followed by a Belgium-residing Congolese, Caroline Kondé, in 2022.

== History ==
Initially, the Democratic Republic of the Congo was expected to make its debut in Miss Grand International in 2014 when a Manchester-based Congolese model, Anna Naise Gumanda, was announced as the country representative; however, Naise did not join the pageant for unknown reasons. Later in 2022, DR Congo was expected to participate in the Miss Grand International 2022 in Indonesia, with a Congolese businessperson from Belgium, Caroline Kondé, as the representative. Nevertheless, Caroline did not enter the international tournaments for undisclosed reasons.

An attempt was made to organize the inaugural Miss Grand Democratic Republic of the Congo on 27 September 2025. Seven contestants were confirmed with the declared intention that the winner would represent the nation at the Miss Grand International 2025 competition in Thailand. However, the event was ultimately cancelled following a warning issued by the international organizing body, which stated that the domestic organizer, Merton'y Business, had not acquired the official license for that year.

== International competition ==
The following is a list of Democratic Republic of the Congo representatives at the Miss Grand International contest.

Year	Representative	Original national title	Result		National director
Year	Representative	Original national title	Placement	Other awards	National director
2014	Naise Gumanda	—N/a	Did not compete		Unknown
No titleholders from 2015 to 2021
2022	Caroline Kondé	—N/a	Did not compete		Caroline Kondé
No titleholders since 2023

== Miss Grand RD Congo 2025 ==
Miss Grand Democratic Republic of the Congo 2025
- Date: 27 September 2025
- Venue: Sultani Hotel, Kinshasa
- Producer: Merton'y Business
- Entrants: 7
- Winner: (Pageant cancelled)

Miss Grand Democratic Republic of the Congo 2025 (French: Miss Grand République Démocratique du Congo 2025) originally was expected to be the first Miss Grand RD Congo pageant, set for 27 September 2025 at the Sultani Hotel in Kinshasa. Seven contestants, who qualified through the audition round held earlier on 2 September, were expected to compete for the right to represent the Democratic Republic of the Congo internationally at the Miss Grand International 2025 contest, held in Thailand on 18 October 2025. However, the pageant was cancelled following a warning issued by the Miss Grand International Organization, as the designated organizer for Miss Grand République Démocratique du Congo (RDC), Merton'y Business, had not purchased the official franchise license for that year.

=== Contestants ===
Nine contestants have been confirmed.

1. Loleke Laurene
2. Amina Julianna
3. Lokangu Reine
4. Evodi Esala (withdrew)
5. Kat Goretti
6. Lembikisa Mercia (withdrew)
7. Mbombo Ella
8. Kaninda Samara
9. Libwa Daniella
