= MGI All Stars =

Special edition of Miss Grand International featuring returning beauty queens

- MGI All Stars Logo
- Formation: December 4, 2025
- Type: Beauty pageant
- Headquarters: Thailand
- Location: Bangkok
- Official language: English
- Founder: Nawat Itsaragrisil
- Vice President: Ratchaphol Chantaratim; Teresa Chaivisut
- First edition: 2026
- Current Titleholder: Vanessa Pulgarin
- Parent organization: MGI PCL
- Website: missgrandinternational.com

MGI All Stars is a beauty pageant run by Miss Grand International (MGI) for women who have already competed in an international pageant, whether under MGI or another organisation. It was announced in December 2025 and first held in 2026.

The first winner was Vanessa Pulgarin of Colombia, crowned at MGI Hall in Bangkok on May 30, 2026 from a field of 56.

== History ==
Miss Grand International is an international beauty pageant founded in 2013 and run from Thailand. It judges on four criteria it calls beauty, body, brain and business, and campaigns under the slogan "Stop the War and Violence".

MGI announced All Stars on December 4, 2025 as a competition separate from its annual edition, open to "beauty queens from any pageant" rather than to former MGI contestants alone. Entry is open to women and trans women aged 20 to 40, married or single, with or without children, who have competed in an international pageant before, whether or not they placed.

The winner receives the All Stars Crown and a cash prize of between US$100,000 and US$1,000,000. The organisation gave as its purposes the recognition of what returning contestants had gained since their earlier attempts, and a second chance for those who had underperformed or withdrawn.

== Format ==
Preliminary competition runs over two days, the first for swimsuit and evening gown, the second for cocktail dress and a bare-face round. On the final night the field is cut to a top 25, then to a top 10, and the top five take a question-and-answer round. MGI did not publish full judging criteria before the first edition.

The All Stars title is separate from the main Miss Grand International crown, and its holder does not succeed the reigning Miss Grand International.

== Titleholders ==
Edition	Date	MGI All Stars	Country	International Placement	Venue	Entrants	Ref.
1st	May 30, 2026	Vanessa Pulgarin	Colombia	Contestant — Miss International 2017 Top 12 — Miss Universe 2025	Bangkok, Thailand	56	
2nd	December 12, 2026				Bangkok, Thailand		

== Gallery ==
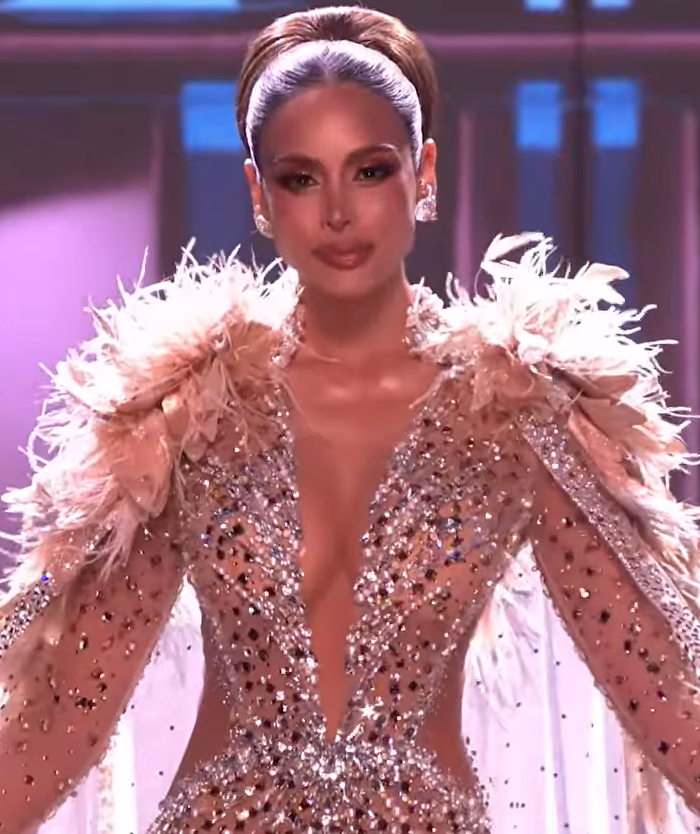
MGI All Stars inaugural winner
Vanessa Pulgarin

== Crown ==
The trophy of the competition is the All Stars Crown, designed by Beauty Star (Beauty Gems) for the first edition in 2026.

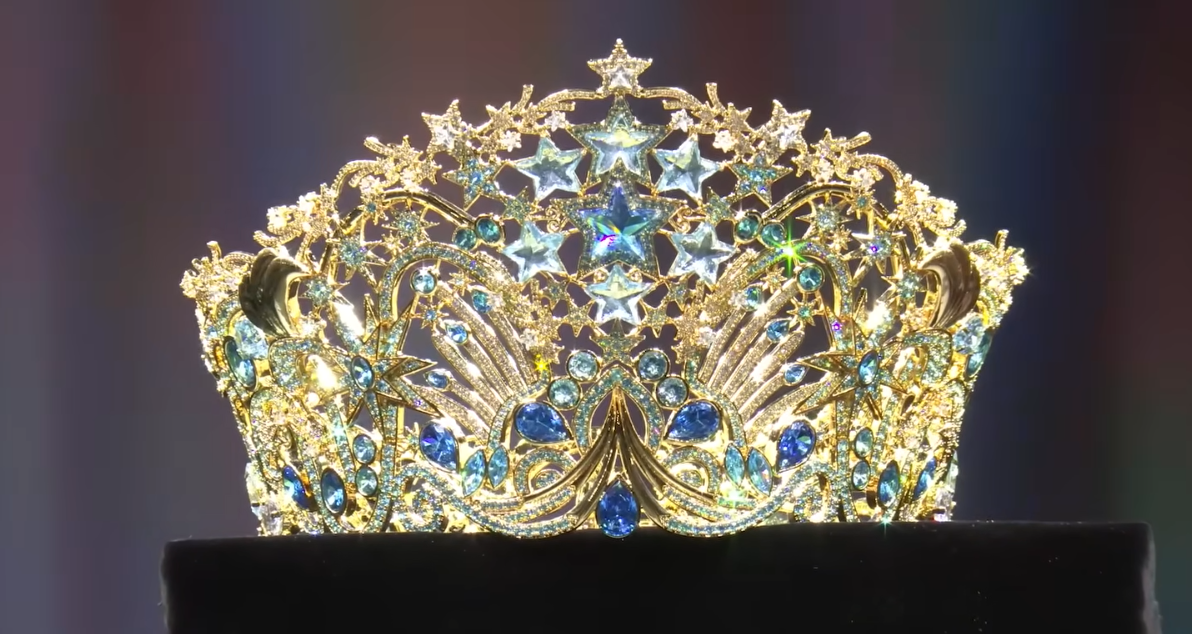
The All Stars Crown for the inaugural edition of MGI All Stars.

== See also ==
- Miss Grand International
- Beauty pageant
- List of beauty pageants
