= Distar =

Distar may refer to:

- DiStar, an electronics manufacturer based in Thailand
- DISTAR, a method of direct instruction for teaching reading
- Distar Air, a Czech aircraft manufacturer
- Společnost DISTAR CZ a.s., a diversified Czech manufacturing company
