= Miss Grand Macau 2025 =

1st Miss Grand Macau pageant

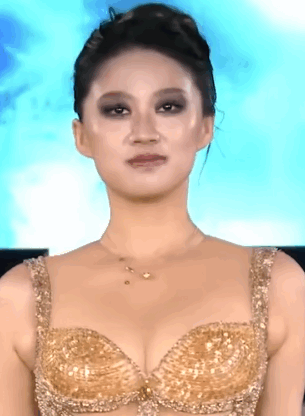
- Elena Wang, the winner of the contest
- Date: 9 July 2025
- Venue: Haiya Mega Mall, Shenzhen, China
- Producer: Xie Luxingdan Media
- Entrants: 24
- Placements: 15
- Winner: Elena Wang Qinwen
- Photogenic: Elena Wang Qinwen
- Popularity: Li Shan

Miss Grand Macau 2025 (Chinese: 2025 萬國小姐澳門) was the inaugural edition of the Miss Grand Macau pageant, held at the Haiya Mega Mall in Shenzhen, China, on 9 July 2025. Contestants from across China, including Macau and Hong Kong, competed for the title. It was organized by Xie Luxingdan Media chaired by an interprenuer Carry Xie Lu Dan, who served as the national director of Miss Grand International for Macau since 2024.

The pageant's grand finals was attended by the reigning Miss Grand International 2024, CJ Opiaza of the Philippines, and the vice president of Miss Grand International, Teresa Chaivisut. Both, along with the organizer Carry Xie, several businessperson, and former Chinese beauty queens and kings, including Liang Huiyi, Li Xiaohua, Zhang Manlin, Jiang Siqi, Yang Jianhua, Liao Qianlin, Xie Yunli, Kong Ze, Xu Wenxin, and Wei Zihong, made up the panel of judges.

The contest was won by a 24-year-old Elena Wang Qinwen (王沁文) from Coloane, who was crowned by the preceding Miss Grand Macau 2024, Ohm Zhang. Elena will internationally represent Macau at Miss Grand International 2025, set to take place in Bangkok, Thailand, on 18 October 2025.

In addition to the main winner, several China, Hong Kong, and Macau representatives for other international pageants, such as Miss Earth 2025, were also named at the event.

== Results ==
=== Main placements ===
Position	Candidate	International competition
Miss Grand Macau 2025	Wang Qinwen 王沁文	Unplaced – Miss Grand International 2025
Miss Earth Macau 2025	Chen Sibei 陈思蓓	Top 25 – Miss Earth 2025
1st runner-up	Zhuang Weiqiao 庄为乔	
Top 10	Yang Yanshuang 杨艳双	
Top 10	Shu Lin 舒琳	
Top 10	Xinyi Gucao	
Top 10	Li Shan 黎姗	
Top 10	Chen Siyue 陈思悦	
Top 10	Zhang Yi 张怡	
Top 10	Zhu Cancan 朱灿灿	
Top 15	Song Yixin 宋艺欣; Luo Yachen 罗雅晨; Lian Jiani 连嘉妮; Yan Hong 鄢红; Xia Tian 夏天	

=== Special awards ===
The following is a list of supplemental awards delivered in the 2025 Miss Grand Macau pageant.

Award	Candidate	Award	Candidate
Best Body	Zhu Cancan 朱灿灿	Best Commercially Value	Li Shan 黎姗
Best Temperament	Xinyi Gucao	Best Stage Presence	Song Yixin 宋艺欣
Best Charm	Yangchun Baixue 阳春白雪	Best Social Media	Chen Siyue 陈思悦
Best Manners	Lian Jiani 连嘉妮	Miss Popularity	
Best Photogenic	Wang Qinwen 王沁文	Winner	Li Shan 黎姗
Best Performance	Luo Yachen 罗雅晨	1st runner-up	Katherine Shu
Best Talent	Yan Hong 鄢红	2nd runner-up	Xinyi Gucao
