= Miss Grand Ivory Coast =

Beauty pageant in Ivory Coast

Miss Grande Ivory Coast
- Formation: October 1, 2022; 4 years ago
- Type: Beauty pageant
- Headquarters: Abidjan
- Location: Ivory Coast
- Members: Miss Planet International; Miss Premium African International
- Official language: French
- Directors: Tatiana Kacou; Kelly Serge
- Parent organization: Comite Miss Grande Côte d'Ivoire (COMIGCI)
- Website: MissGrandeCI.com

Miss Grand Ivory Coast
- Formation: 2014
- Type: Beauty pageant
- Headquarters: Abidjan
- Location: Ivory Coast
- Members: Miss Grand International
- Official language: French
- Director: Traoré Kasoum (2026)
- Parent organization: Comité Miss Intercommunale

Miss Grand Ivory Coast (French: Miss Grande Côte d'Ivoire) is a national beauty pageant for women in the Ivory Coast, headquartered in Abidjan. The competition was established in 2022 by the Comité Miss Grande Côte d'Ivoire (COMIGCI), under the directorship of Kelly Serge and Tatiana Kacou. As the organization does not hold the national license for Miss Grand International, the winners of the contest have instead been designated to participate in alternative international competitions, including Miss Planet International and Miss Premium African International.

Ivory Coast has participated in the Miss Grand International pageant only once, in 2014, when the country was represented by Richlove Amissah, who did not achieve placement among the finalists.

== History ==
The inaugural Miss Grand Ivory Coast pageant was organized in 2022 under the direction of Kelly Serge and Tatiana Kacou and featured nine finalists; it was held on 1 October at the Amphithéâtre de la Cité Rouge in Abidjan, where Sandra N’Guessan, a Baoulé candidate from the host city, was declared the winner. Although initially slated to represent Ivory Coast at the Miss Grand International 2022 pageant in Indonesia, her participation did not materialize due to the absence of a locally secured license, and she was instead assigned to compete in other international beauty competitions.

In 2024, the franchise rights to designate an Ivory Coast representative to Miss Grand International were conferred upon Celest Productions, a Paris-based pageant organization led by Angell Robles Yanez, who has also served as the director of Miss Grand France since 2023.

== Editions ==
=== Location and date ===
Edition	Date	Venue	Entrants	Ref.
1st	October 1, 2022	Amphithéatre de la Cité Rouge, Cocody Danga, Abidjan	9	
2nd	September 1, 2023	Yelam's Theater, Treichville, Abidjan	14	

=== Competition results ===
Year	Miss Grand Ivory Coast	1st Runner-Up	2nd Runner-Up	Ref.
2022	Sandra N'guessan	Esther Dongo	Mouna Fofana	
2023	Lago Christiane	Bah Maeva	Aboa Jennifer	

== International competition ==
The following is a list of Miss Grande Côte d'Ivoire representatives who competed internationally.

Year	International pageant	Representative	National qualification	Competition performance		National director(s)
Year	International pageant	Representative	National qualification	Placement	Other awards	National director(s)
2014	Miss Grand International 2014	Richlove Amissah	Appointment	Unplaced	—	Self-dominated
No representatives from 2015 to 2023
2022	Miss Planet International 2022	Sandra N'guessan	Miss Grande Côte d'Ivoire 2022	Withdrew		Tatiana Kacou; Marlene Sié
2022	Miss Premium African International 2022	Sandra N'guessan	Miss Grande Côte d'Ivoire 2022	Withdrew		Tatiana Kacou; Marlene Sié
2024	Miss Planet International 2024	Lago Christiane	Miss Grande Côte d'Ivoire 2023	Unplaced	—	Tatiana Kacou; Marlene Sié
2024	Miss Grand International 2024	Aya Kadjo	1st runner-up Miss Grand France 2023	Unplaced	—	Angell Robles Yanez
2025	No representative					
2026	Miss Grand International 2026	Marlène Kouassi	Miss Côte d'Ivoire 2022	5th Runners-Up	Best in Swimsuit	Traoré Kasoum

== Gallery ==
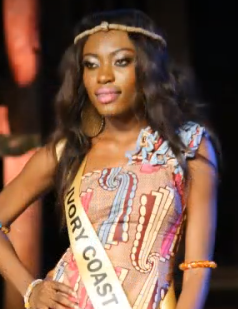
Richlove Amissah
Miss Grand Ivory Coast 2014

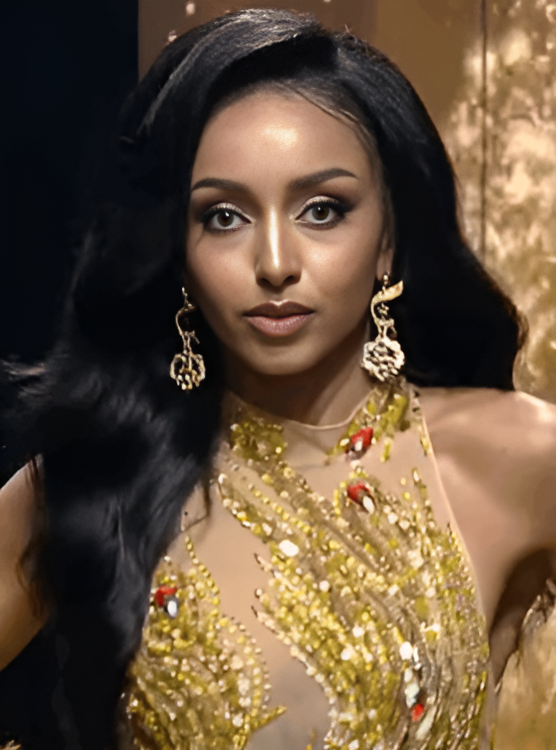
Aya Kadjo
Miss Grand Ivory Coast 2024

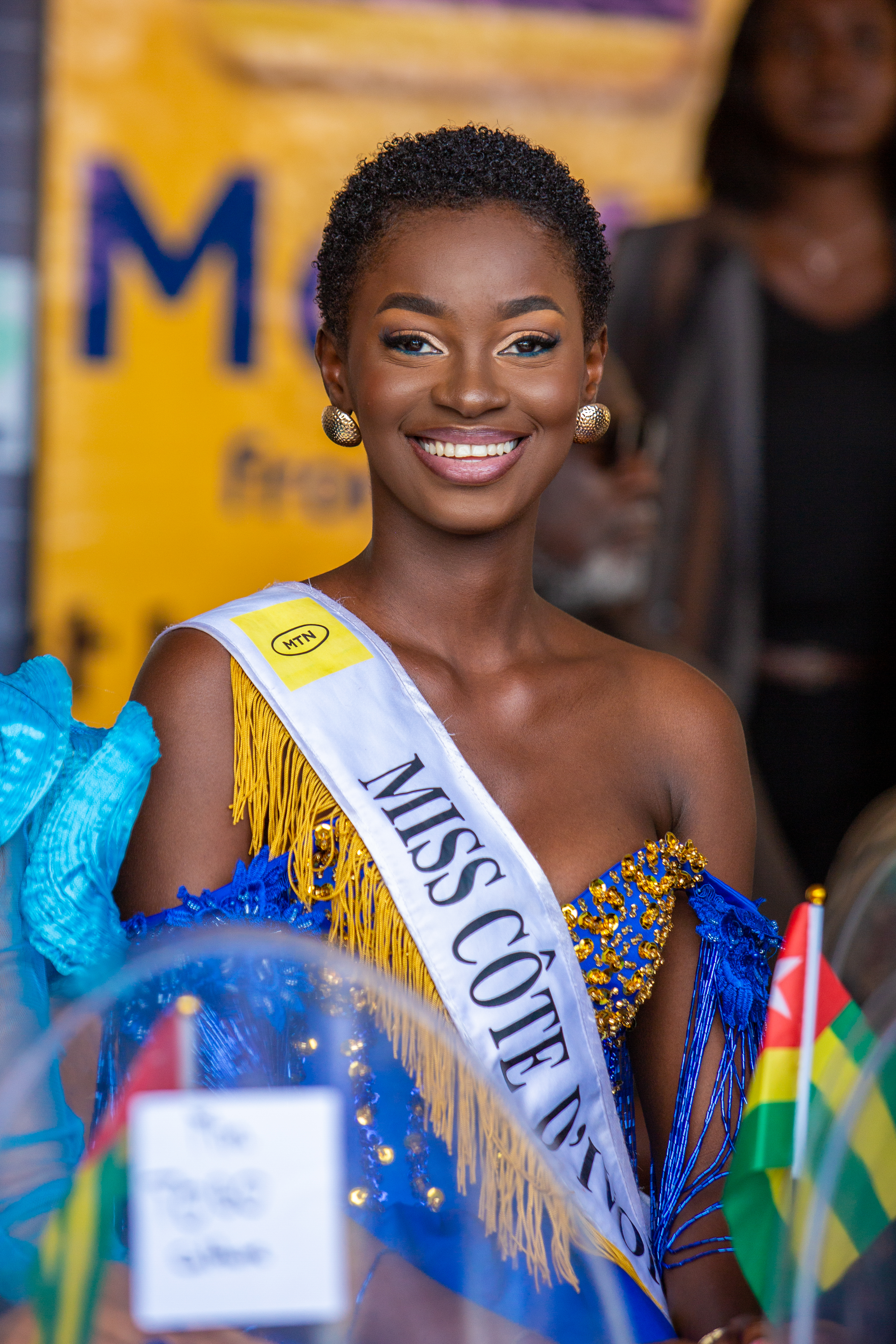
Marlène Kouassi
Miss Grand Ivory Coast 2026
