= Miss Grand Greece =

Greek beauty pageant title

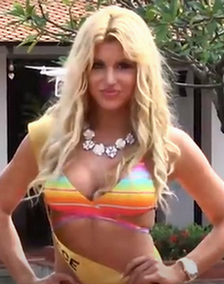
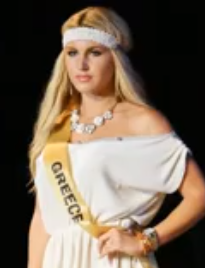
- Anastasia Terzi; Miss Grand Greece 2014
- Formation: 2013
- Type: Beauty pageant
- Headquarters: Athens
- Location: Greece
- Members: Miss Grand International
- Official language: Greek
- National director: Vassilis Prevelakis
- Parent organization: Star Hellas (2013 – 2014, 2023)

Miss Grand Greece is a national beauty pageant title awarded to Greek representatives chosen to compete at the Miss Grand International pageant. It was first awarded in 2013 to Anastasia Papatsori, one of the Star Hellas 2012 finalists, and then in 2014 to a Dubai-based model, Anastasia Terzi.

As of 2023, the Miss Grand Greece franchise belonged to the Star Hellas pageant.

Since the establishment of Miss Grand International, Greece participated three times; in 2013, 2014, and 2023, but all of its representatives were unplaced.

== History ==
Greece debuted in the Miss Grand International pageant in 2013, and it was represented by an appointed Anastasia Papatsori, who was one of the Star Hellas 2012 finalists; however, Papatsori was not qualified for the top 20 round on the international stage. In the following years, a singer, model and doctor, Anastasia Terzi, was assigned to compete internationally in the 2014 Miss Grand International, but she also failed to secure any placements.

From 2015 to 2022, no Greece's representatives at Miss Grand International. Later in 2023, Star Hellas acquired the license and appointed the 2022 Miss Young winner, Ioanna Skoula, to compete at Miss Grand International 2023 in Vietnam.

== International competition ==
The following is a list of Greek representatives at the Miss Grand International contest.

Year	Representative		Original national title	Result	
Year	Ramanized	Greek	Original national title	Placement	Other awards
2013	Anastasia Papatsori	Αναστασία Παπατσώρη	Star Hellas 2012 finalist	Unplaced	—
2014	Anastasia Terzi	Αναστασία Τερζή	Appointed	Unplaced	—
No representatives from 2015 to 2022
2023	Ioanna Skoula	Ιωάννα Σκουλά	Miss Young 2022	Unplaced	—
2024	No representative				
No representatives between 2025 - present
