= Ratchaphol Chantaratim =

Thai businessperson

- Born: Samut Prakan, Thailand
- Other names: Peter (ปีเตอร์)
- Citizenship: Thailand
- Occupation: Businessperson
- Years active: 2013–present
- Known for: Miss Grand International

Ratchaphol Chantaratim (Thai: รัชพล จันทรทิม; nicknamed Peter) is a Thai businessperson, who has been serving as vice president of Miss Grand International, as well as the deputy chief executive officer of its parent firm, Miss Grand International Limited, since its establishment in 2013. Ratchaphol originally held approximately forty percent of the company's issued capital, but that was later decreased to twenty-nine percent after the company was transformed into a public limited company and completed an initial public offering (IPO) in 2023.

While another vice president, Teresa Chaivisut, oversees the organization's foreign activities, Ratchapol manages the company's internal operations, including the legal office. He is also a member of the board of directors of Miss Grand International PLC's newly established subsidiary, KMGI Co., Ltd., a cosmetic wholesale and retail company incorporating with another SET-listed company, Karmarts.
