= Miss Grand Macau =

Beauty pageant in Macau

- Formation: 9 July 2025; 15 months ago
- Founder: Carry Xie Lu Dan
- Type: Beauty pageant
- Headquarters: Shenzhen, China
- Members: Miss Grand International
- Official language: English; Cantonese
- National director: Carry Xie Lu Dan
- Parent organization: Macau Pageant Alliance (2013 – 2019)

Miss Grand Macau (Chinese: 萬國小姐澳門) is a national beauty pageant to chosen Macau representative to the Miss Grand International pageant, founded in 2025 by a Shenzhen-based entrepreneur, Carry Xie Lu Dan. The title was first mentioned in 2013 when Tiffany Wong (Chinese: 黃伊婷) was assigned by Miss Macau organizer led by Laura Li named Macau Pageant Alliance (澳門選美連盟; MPA) to compete in the inaugural edition of Miss Grand International in Thailand.

Macau has not yet won the Miss Grand International title. The highest and only placement of Macau candidates was in the top 10 finalists, achieved by Hio Man Chan in 2016.

== History ==
From 2013 to 2019, the right to send Macau candidates to Miss Grand International belonged to Macau Pageant Alliance (澳門選美連盟; MPA), headed by Laura Li. However, no national contest was specifically held to determine Miss Grand Macau titleholders during such a period; all representatives were appointed.

Later in 2024, the license was granted to a Shenzhen-based entrepreneur, Carry Xie Lu Dan, who organized the first Miss Grand Macau contest in July 2025.

Gallery

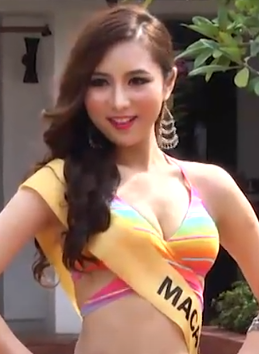
Matilda Ip
Miss Grand Macau 2014

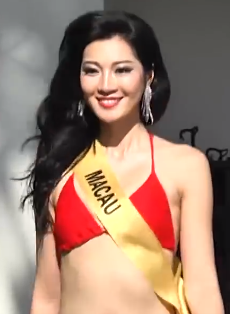
Chloe Lan
Miss Grand Macau 2015

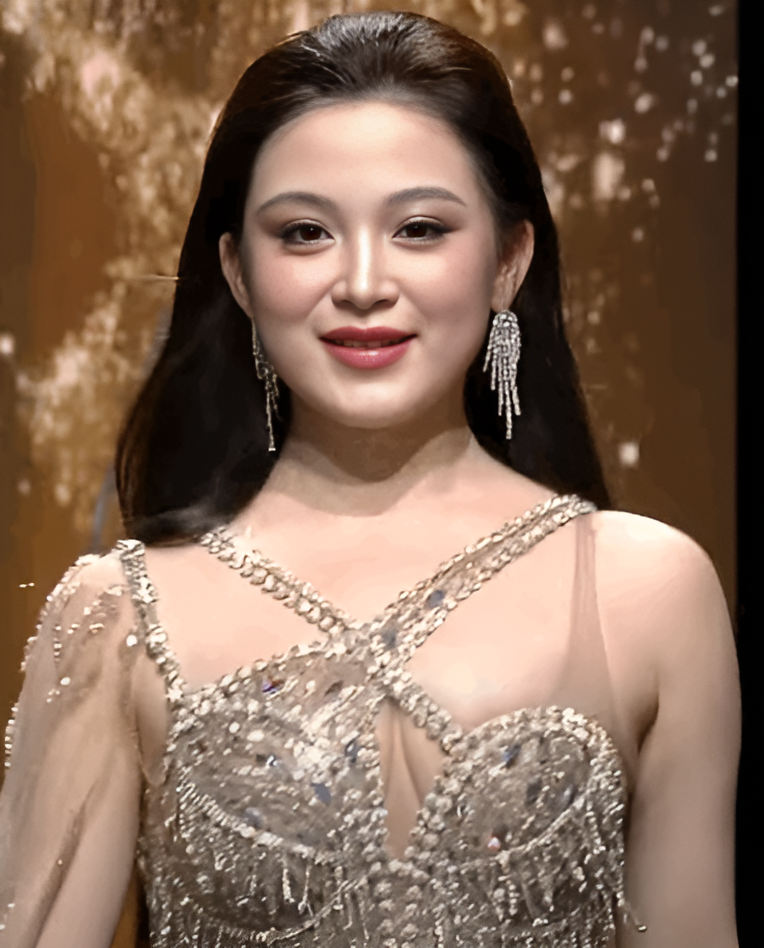
Ohm Zhang
Miss Grand Macau 2024

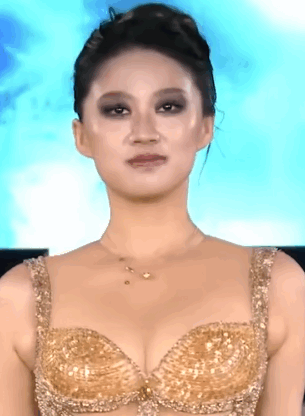
Elena Wang
Miss Grand Macau 2025

== Edition ==
The following list is the edition details of the Miss Grand Macau contest, which was held for the first time in 2025.

Year	Edition	Date	Final venue	Entrants	Winner	Ref.
2025 (Note: Miss Earth Macau 2025 was also elected in the same event.)	1st	9 July 2025	Haiya Mega Mall, Shenzhen, China	24	Elena Wang Qin Wen	
2026 (Note: As Miss Grand Hong Kong and Miss Grand Macau 2026 pageant.)	2nd	29 April 2026	Hengqin, Zhuhai, China	23	Moniece Lam Man Si	

== International competition ==
The following is a list of Macau representatives at the Miss Grand International contest.

Color keys

- : Declared as the winner
- : Ended as a runner-up (Top 5)
- : Ended as a finalist (Top 10)
- : Ended as a semifinalist (Top 20/21)
- : Ended as special awards winner

Year	Miss Grand Macau	National title	Placement	Special Awards	National Director
2026	Moniece Lam Man Si (林旻诗)	Miss Grand Macau 2026	TBA		Carry Xie Lu Dan
2025	Elena Wang Qin Wen (王沁文)	Miss Grand Macau 2025	Unplaced		Carry Xie Lu Dan
2024	Ohm Zhang (歐姆张)	Appointed	Unplaced		Carry Xie Lu Dan
Did not compete between 2020-2023
2019	Yammie Loi Chi Ian (呂芷茵)	Top 8 Miss Macao 2019	Unplaced		Laura Li
2018	Debora Lopes de Oliveira (羅珮兒)	Appointed	Unplaced		Laura Li
2017	Kayii Lei (李嘉儀)	Appointed	Unplaced		Laura Li
2016	Hio Man Chan (陳曉雯)	Miss International Macau 2014	Top 10		Laura Li
2015	Chloe Lan Yan Jing (藍雁晶)	Appointed	Unplaced		Laura Li
2014	Matilda Ip Wing Yin (葉詠賢)	Appointed	Unplaced		Laura Li
2013	Tiffany Wong I Teng (黃伊婷)	Appointed	Unplaced		Laura Li
