= Nawat Itsaragrisil =

Thai TV show host and businessman (born 1965)

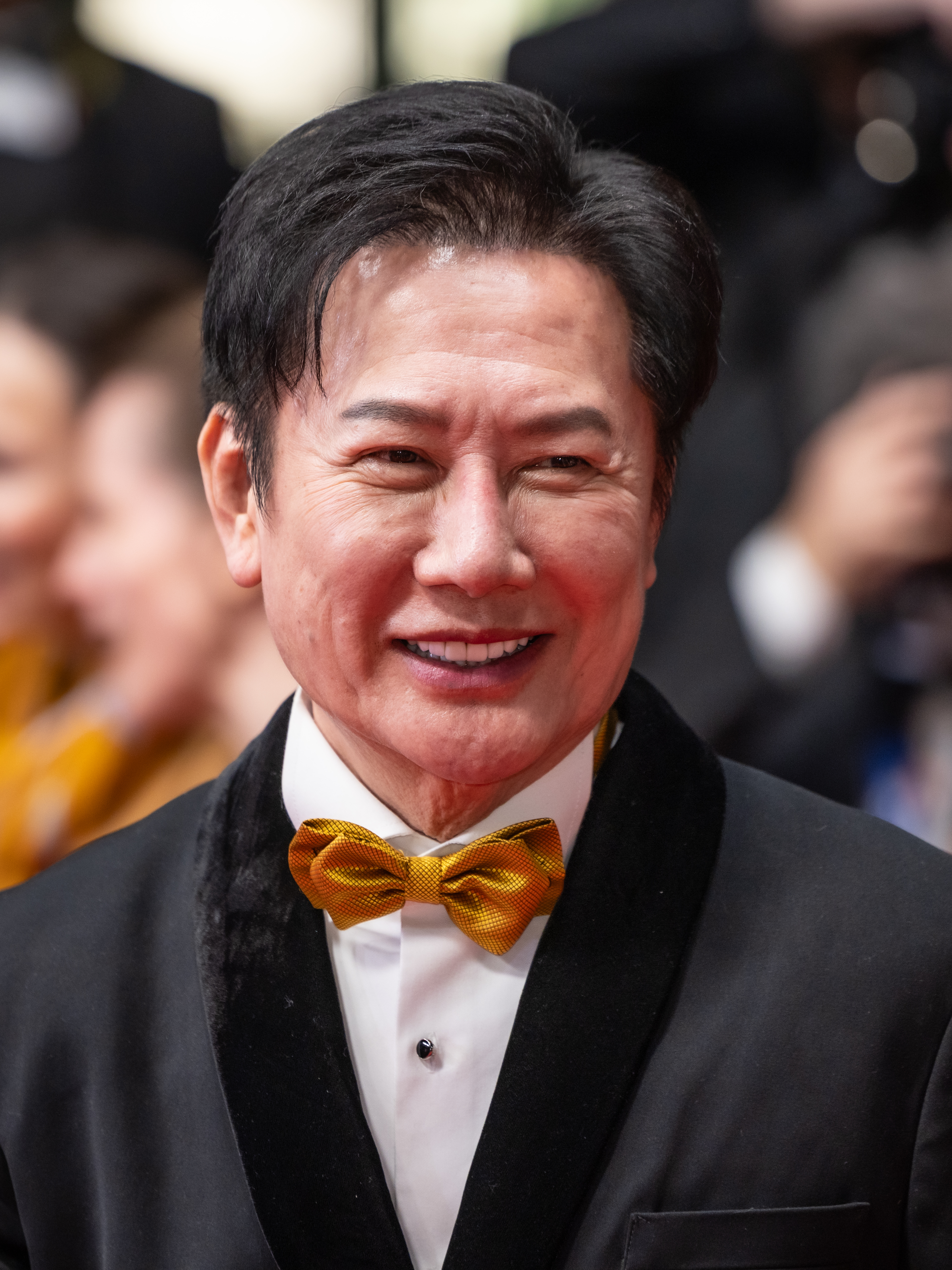
- Itsaragrisil in 2025
- Born: 10 August 1965 (age 61); Damnoen Saduak, Ratchaburi, Thailand
- Citizenship: Thailand; Dominica
- Education: University of the Thai Chamber of Commerce
- Occupations: Media Personality; Businessman
- Years active: 1994–Present

Nawat Itsaragrisil (/ˈnɑːwæt ˌɪtsərəˈɡrɪsɪl/; Thai: ณวัฒน์ อิสรไกรศีล; born 10 August 1965) is a Thai media personality and businessperson, best known as the president of the Miss Grand International and MGI All Stars. He is also the national director of Miss Grand Thailand.

Nawat first became known for travel TV shows, first hosting Exhibition Show and then Kon Thueng Chan (ก่อนถึงจันทร์) for ITV. He then joined Channel 3, hosting the travel segment variety talk show Today Show and becoming the director and executive producer of the Miss Thailand World beauty pageant from 2007 to 2012. He started his own beauty pageant franchise, Miss Grand Thailand and Miss Grand International in 2013. In 2025 Nawat acquired Miss Universe Thailand license from TPN Global as well as appointed as executive director of Miss Universe pageant. In 2026, Nawat acquired the franchise of Miss Universe Indonesia, Miss Universe Vietnam, Miss Universe Laos, Miss Universe Malaysia and Miss Universe Singapore.

== Appearances ==
Television

- 2004 : ทไวไลท์โชว์ On Air Channel 3 (2004-2007)
- 2008 : โวยาเจอร์ เกมการเดินทางในต่างแดน (Eng. trans.: Voyager, an overseas travel game) On Air Channel 9 (2008-2009)
- 2009 : ทูไนท์โชว์ On Air Channel 3 (2009-2015)
- 2009 : ทูเดย์โชว์ On Air Channel 3 (2009-2021)
- 2012 : เพชรรามา On Air Channel 3 (2012-2021)
- 2013 : ครัวคุณต๋อย On Air Channel 3 (2013-2021)

== Controversies ==
In 2016, Nawat was reported by Miss Iceland 2015, Arna Ýr Jónsdóttir to have said that "she's too fat and needed to lose weight" prior to the finals of Miss Grand International 2016 held in Las Vegas on October 25, 2016, eventually dropping out of the pageant before the coronation due to the controversy. In a statement, Nawat said that they give similar advice to other contestants who asked what should they do to improve in order to win. Nawat eventually said that he had spoken with Jónsdóttir along with the company's vice president and clarified matters. In 2022, Nawat has also publicly stated in a live stream that "Miss Vietnam had too long a torso and too short legs" as to the reason why Miss Vietnam failed to make top 10 in Miss Grand International 2022, enraging Vietnamese beauty fans.

Nawat has also expressed displeasure about the behavior of Filipino pageant fans online. This is after several incidents of Filipino pageant fans attacking him on social media. These incidents include accusations of Nawat rigging the results of Miss Grand International, of him having a bias against Filipina contestants, an Instagram post where Nawat insinuated that the coronation of Catriona Gray as Miss Universe 2018 was a rigged affair and saying that Miss Philippines 2018 didn't make it due to the rest of the contestants being better than her.

Nawat has also gotten into a verbal row with the Miss Supranational organization after the then reigning Miss Supranational Chanique Rabe did not include Miss Grand into what she considers the "Big Five" of pageants, saying that those pageants were "minor crowns".

In 2025, Nawat publicly body-shamed Rachel Gupta, the winner of Miss Grand International 2024, through an Instagram post after she announced her decision to step down from her role. He shared two images of Rachel labeled 'Before' and 'After,' insinuating she had undergone cosmetic surgery. He also posted another photo accusing her of altering her appearance surgically. The Indian Pageant and Glamour responded, stating, "There should be no place for someone like him in an organization such as Miss Universe. It should be a platform for empowerment, not harassment".

=== 2025 Miss Universe ===
In November 2025, he insulted Miss Mexico Fátima Bosch, who went on to win Miss Universe 2025, by referring to her as a "dumb head" should she follow the orders from Mexico's Miss Universe national director, who he claimed to have instructed Bosch not to post content related to Thailand, and in spite of her clarifying that it was a misunderstanding. He then got security personnel to escort her out. Further, when contestants began walking out of the room, he instructed security in the Thai language to "shut the door", seemingly to prevent contestants from leaving. After doing this Miss Universe 2024 Victoria Kjær Theilvig walked out of the hall and all other contestants followed her. Nawat claimed that he was misunderstood, however Raul Rocha, the president of Miss Universe Organization, stepped in thereafter and declared that Nawat would be restricted from participating in subsequent activities as much as possible while bringing in executives from MUO to manage the rest of the contest. Nawat subsequently apologised for his actions. In another apology to all contestants, he reiterated that he was misunderstood, that he didn't use the word 'dumb head', but 'damage' instead.

Fifteen days after his removal from official activities, on 19 November 2025, Gabrielle Henry, Miss Universe Jamaica 2025, fell through an unguarded opening in the stage floor during the preliminary competition's evening gown round at the Impact Challenger Hall in Nonthaburi. Nawat, in his capacity as Chairman of the Miss Universe Thailand Host Committee, stated the following day that Henry had no broken bones and was safe. This characterisation was directly contradicted by a joint statement issued on 8 December 2025 by the Miss Universe Organization and the Henry family, which confirmed that Henry had sustained an intracranial haemorrhage with loss of consciousness, a fracture, a collapsed lung, and facial lacerations, and that the Miss Universe Organization had assumed full and immediate responsibility for the incident. The joint statement confirmed the Organization had never attributed blame to Henry and that suggestions to the contrary were entirely inaccurate.
