= Miss Grand International =

International beauty pageant franchised based in Thailand

- Type: International women's beauty pageant
- Parent organization: MGI PCL
- Headquarters: Bangkok, Thailand
- First edition: 2013
- Most recent edition: 2026
- Current titleholder: Jihan Dimack; Tanzania
- President and founder: Nawat Itsaragrisil
- Vice Presidents: Teresa Chaivisut; Ratchaphol Chantaratim
- Language: English
- Website: missgrandinternational.com

Miss Grand International, also known as Miss Grand, is an international beauty pageant franchise that is based in Thailand. It consists of the annual national pageant Miss Grand Thailand, as well as the international competition Miss Grand International, to which participating rights are licensed to organizers in other countries. The franchise has been owned and run by a Thai stock exchange-listed company with the same name, also known as MGI PCL, since its inception in 2013, with Nawat Itsaragrisil as the president.

The current Miss Grand International is Jihan Dimack of Tanzania. She became the first Tanzanian and the first delegate representing an African nation to win the title.

== History ==
Miss Grand International was founded in 2013 by Nawat Itsaragrisil, a Thai television host and producer. The pageant was founded in Thailand amidst a political crisis, inspiring the organizers to use the slogan "No mob, Stop the Wars" as part of its identity, later rephrased to "Stop the War and Violence" in the following year. The organisation states that the pageant campaigns against armed conflict of every kind.

Reigning titleholders serve as the organisation's spokesperson for the year and appear at charity events tied to that campaign. Their activities have included working with the United Nations High Commissioner for Refugees to raise funds for humanitarian aid, visiting refugee camps and donating supplies to the internally displaced people there, speaking at related events, serving as ambassador for NGOs such as the Catholic Medical Mission Board and Model United Nations, and joining projects of local charities in the countries they visit. Before 2021 the winner and runners-up often campaigned for the Tourism Authority of Thailand.

Contestants are selected by the licensee in each country. The first three competitions were held in Thailand, sponsored by the government of Thailand and televised on Channel 7, while later editions have also been held abroad, and broadcast on local television channels and on the pageant's YouTube and Facebook accounts.

The 2019 edition was held in Venezuela during the political crisis there, and the delegates of South Korea, Cambodia and Laos, among others, withdrew over security and visa problems. The 2020 edition was to have been held in Venezuela on 25 October, but the COVID-19 pandemic delayed it to 2021 and moved it to Bangkok.

On 4 December 2025 the organisation announced MGI All Stars, a separate competition for women who have already competed in an international pageant.

== Contestant selection ==
The franchise holder in each country or territory selects its contestant by national contest, internal casting or direct appointment. In the first decade almost half were appointed rather than chosen in a national pageant. In countries where pageants have a large following, particularly in East Asia and the Americas, an annual national pageant selects the entrant. Examples are Miss Grand Cambodia, Miss Grand Malaysia, Miss Grand Nepal and Miss Grand Paraguay. Some entrants have instead been winners or runners-up of other national pageants, among them Femina Miss India (2015–2021), Binibining Pilipinas (2013, 2015 – 2022), Miss Mexico (2017 – 2020), Felvidék Szépe (2015 – 2017), etc.

Although the event draws less commercial interest in Europe and Africa, a number of countries there hold their own Miss Grand pageants, among them Albania, Kosovo, Spain, France, Italy, and South Africa.

In Spain, Italy and several Asian countries each administrative division holds a preliminary competition to choose its delegate to the national pageant. In parts of Spain, Malaysia and Thailand, third-level divisions hold their own pageants to send delegates to the provincial round, whose winners carry the title "Miss Grand" with the province name for their year. The swimsuit competition has kept some countries out, among them conservative and Muslim-majority states, while others have not taken part for want of funding.

The Miss Grand name is registered internationally, but unrelated pageants use it. They include the Azerbaijani model search "Miss and Mister Grand Azerbaijan", run by Elxan Pashayev since 2018, "Miss Zimbabwe Grand", run by Farai Zembeni since 2019, whose finalists enter continental contests in Africa, and "Miss Grand Bahama", held in the Bahamas since 1970 and named for the island of Grand Bahama.

== Main pageant ==
The first edition was held in Bangkok in 2013 with sponsorship from the government of Thailand and featured 73 participating countries; the inaugural titleholder was Janelee Chaparro of Puerto Rico. In 2016, the pageant was held for the first time outside Thailand, at Westgate Las Vegas, Las Vegas, US, on 25 October. From 2015 the grand final has usually fallen on 25 October. The COVID-19 pandemic delayed two editions: the 2020 final, set for 25 October that year, was put back to 27 March 2021 and moved to Bangkok, and the 2021 final was held that December, two months late. Twice the reigning titleholder has been unable to complete her duties and the first runner-up has been appointed in her place. The first occurred in 2015, when Claire Elizabeth Parker of Australia took over the title after Anea Garcia of the Dominican Republic. The second took place in 2024, when Christine Juliane Opiaza of the Philippines succeeded Rachel Gupta of India.

The current titleholder is Jihan Dimack of Tanzania, crowned on 10 October 2026 at MGI Hall in Bangkok. She is the first Tanzanian and African to hold the title.

Edition	Date	Final venue	Host country	Entrants	Ref.
2013	19 November	Impact Arena, Muang Thong Thani, Nonthaburi	Thailand	71	
2014	7 October	Indoor Stadium Huamark, Bangkok	Thailand	85	
2015	25 October	Indoor Stadium Huamark, Bangkok	Thailand	77	
2016	25 October	Westgate Las Vegas, Las Vegas, Nevada	United States	74	
2017	25 October	Vinpearl Convention Center, Phú Quốc	Vietnam	77	
2018	25 October	The One Entertainment Park, Yangon	Myanmar	75	
2019	25 October	Poliedro de Caracas, Caracas	Venezuela	60	
2020	27 March 2021	Show DC Hall, Bangkok	Thailand	63	
2021	4 December	Show DC Hall, Bangkok	Thailand	59	
2022	25 October	Sentul International Convention Center, West Java	Indonesia	68	
2023	25 October	Phú Thọ Indoor Stadium, Ho Chi Minh City	Vietnam	69	
2024	25 October	MGI Hall, Bravo BKK Mall, Bangkok	Thailand	68	
2025	18 October	MGI Hall, Bravo BKK Mall, Bangkok	Thailand	77	
2026	10 October	MGI Hall, Bravo BKK Mall, Bangkok	Thailand	77	
2027	October	MGI Hall, Bravo BKK Mall, Bangkok	Thailand	TBA	

=== Pre-pageant activities ===
Three events precede the final: the swimsuit competition, the national costume parade and the preliminary contest. The swimsuit competition is held at a separate venue and decides the Best in Swimsuit award; the national costume parade and the preliminary round usually take place at the final venue. All three are streamed on the pageant's Facebook and YouTube accounts. Contestants appear in swimwear and evening gowns before a panel of preliminary judges. These rounds decide the Best Evening Gown and Best in Swimsuit awards, which are announced on the final night along with Best National Costume and Miss Popular Vote. Scores from the preliminary and swimsuit rounds, the ancillary events and a closed-door interview together determine the top 20 on the night of the final.

==== Awards ====
Edition	Best in Swimsuit	Best National Costume	Best Evening Gown	Miss Popular Vote	Country's Power of The Year	Best Social Media	Grand Talent (Note: Before 2025, named the Grand Voice Award.)	Ref.
2013	LVA	CHN	DOM	MMR	Not Awarded	Not Awarded	Not Awarded	
2014	THA	VNM	IDN	KHM	Not Awarded	JPN	Not Awarded	
2015	CRI	PHL	JPN	LKA	Not Awarded	IND	Not Awarded	
2016	BHS	IDN	ENG	KOR	Not Awarded	JAM	Not Awarded	
2017	CRI	IDN	CHN	IDN	Not Awarded	PRY	Not Awarded	
2018	CUB	PER	THA	VNM	Not Awarded	IDN	Not Awarded	
2019	PAN	ECU	PER	VNM	Not Awarded	Not Awarded	Not Awarded	
2020	BRA	GTM; JPN; THA	MEX	MYS	KHM	Not Awarded	Not Awarded	
2021	PRI	AGO; MYS; PER	THA	KHM	Not Awarded	Not Awarded	Not Awarded	
2022	Not Awarded	GBR; PER; THA; VNM	MEX	MUS	VNM	CZE	THA	
2023	DOM	JPN; NGA; VNM	RUS	MMR	MMR	Not Awarded	GHA	
2024	BRA	BRA; ECU; HND	GHA	IDN	THA	Not Awarded	TTO	
2025	THA	BRA; IND; THA	MEX	COL	PHL	Not Awarded	GHA; JPN	
2026	CIV	HKG; PAK; PHL; THA	Not Awarded	TAN Top 25; THA Top 11; ECU Top 5	ECU	Not Awarded	PRI	

=== Grand Final ===
The opening show of the 2021 grand final, performed by Miss Grand International 2020 Abena Appiah, and all 2021 contestants

The grand final of the pageant is usually broadcast worldwide on television and the social media platforms of the pageant. As the tradition of the pageant, twenty semi-finalists are chosen from the initial pool of contestants through observation during the entire pageant, a closed-door interview, swimsuit round as well as a preliminary competition, which featured contestants competing in swimsuits and evening gowns. However, the "Country of the year" was first introduced in 2020 edition, which was selected by the audience on social networks. The winner of this category automatically enters the twenty finalists regardless of all previous scores. The top 20 would then compete in a swimsuit competition, with 10 of them advancing to the top 10, this number eventually was reduced to nine with the 10th semi-finalist being the Top Popularity Winner determined through mobile voting, all 10 semi-finalists would then compete in an evening gown and give their speeches with a 'Stop the War and Violence' theme.

After the speech round and evening gown competitions, the judges then select the top five to compete in the question-and-answer portion, where all entrants will be asked the same question about an ongoing global situation; such as the management of COVID-19 pandemic crisis, the 2016 United States presidential election, and the ongoing socioeconomic and political crisis in Venezuela. The judges select the winner based on their answer and their previous accumulated scores, then the host will sequentially announce the fourth, third and second runners-up. The last two candidates of the top five finalists will then stand in the center of the stage, and one will be named Miss Grand International.

=== Crowns and awards ===
As the tradition of this pageant, the crown of the title holders, known as the Golden Crown, has been set to be changed every 3 years, all versions of the Golden Crown are made of gold and brass for structural integrity, while the exterior is adorned by diamond, and emerald. Its first version was designed by a Thai jewellery design company, God Diamond, headed by Chawalit Chommuang, and was used for the first three editions of the pageant. The crown used from 2016 – 2018 (2nd version) and 2019 – 2024 (3rd and 4th versions) was designed by an unrevealed company and George Wittels, respectively. After transferring the crown to the successor, the immediate predecessor is provided with a replica tiara, which is usually produced by the same designer as its master.

In 2014, the organizer offered US$ 40,000 cash to the winner for spending a year work as the organization's spokesperson in its campaign, the prize was increased from US$ 30,000 in 2013; however, some Vietnamese media published that Nguyễn Thúc Thùy Tiên earned US$ 60,000 for winning the contest in 2021. In 2023, the winner, Luciana Fuster, was reported to have received a total cash prize of US$120,000, disbursed in monthly installments of US$10,000.

Furthermore, all four runners-up of each edition, also received cash prizes, ABS-CBN reported that Samantha Bernardo of the Philippines received US$ 6,000 in cash after she had obtained the first runner-up title at the Miss Grand International 2020 pageant in Bangkok, Thailand, Vartika Singh of India received US$ 4,000 for her second runner-up finish at the 2015 edition, and 3,000 and US$2,000 for the third and fourth runners-up, respectively. Besides the finalists, the winner of each special award also received a prize; approximately US$ 1,000 – 3,000 according to the 2013 to 2015 contests.

Gallery of Miss Grand International crowns

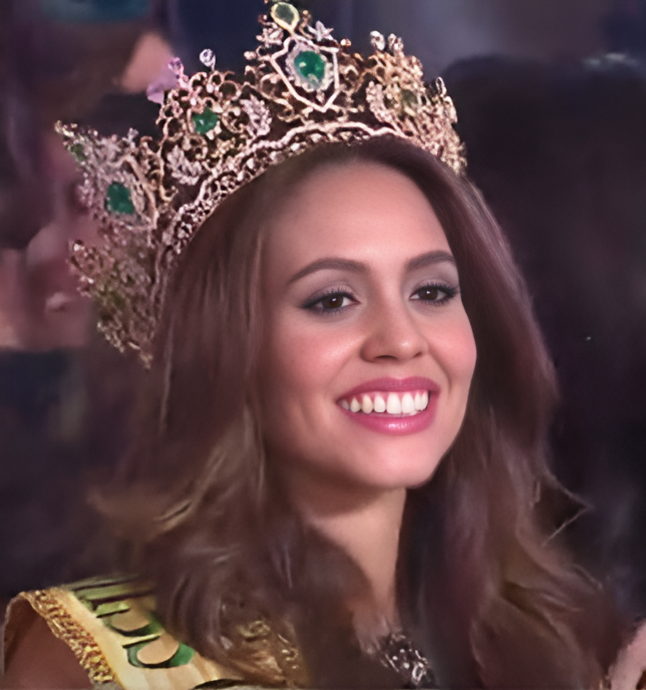
The first edition of the golden crown, as worn by Miss Grand International 2014, Lees Garcia

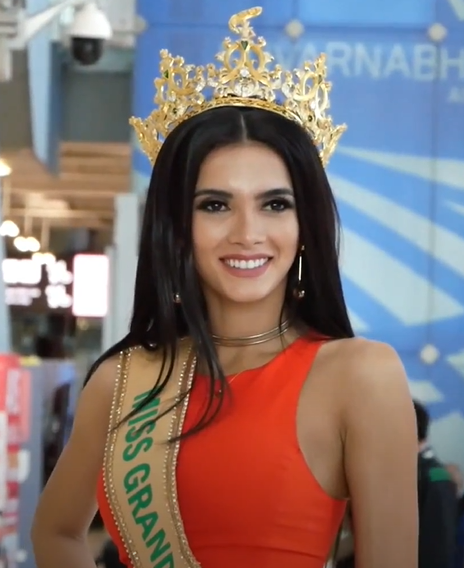
The second edition of the golden crown, as worn by Miss Grand International 2018, Clara Sosa

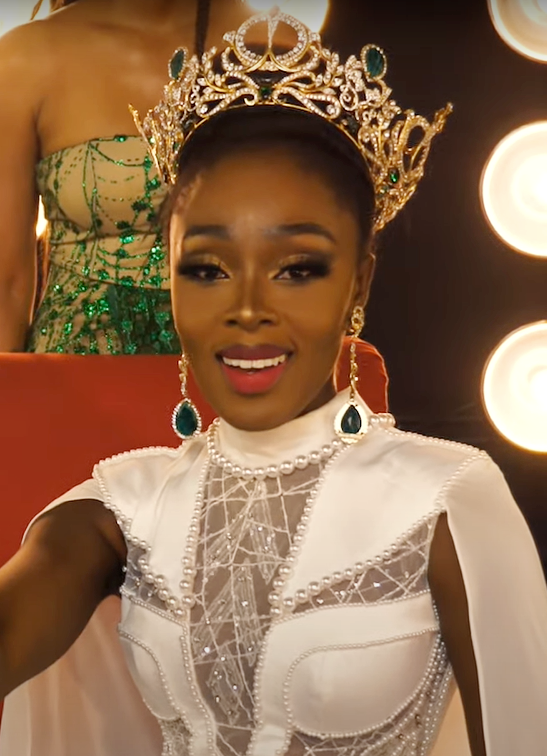
The third edition of the golden crown, as worn by Miss Grand International 2020, Abena Appiah

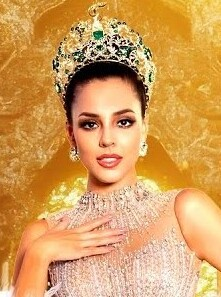
The fourth edition of the golden crown, as worn by Miss Grand International 2023, Luciana Fuster

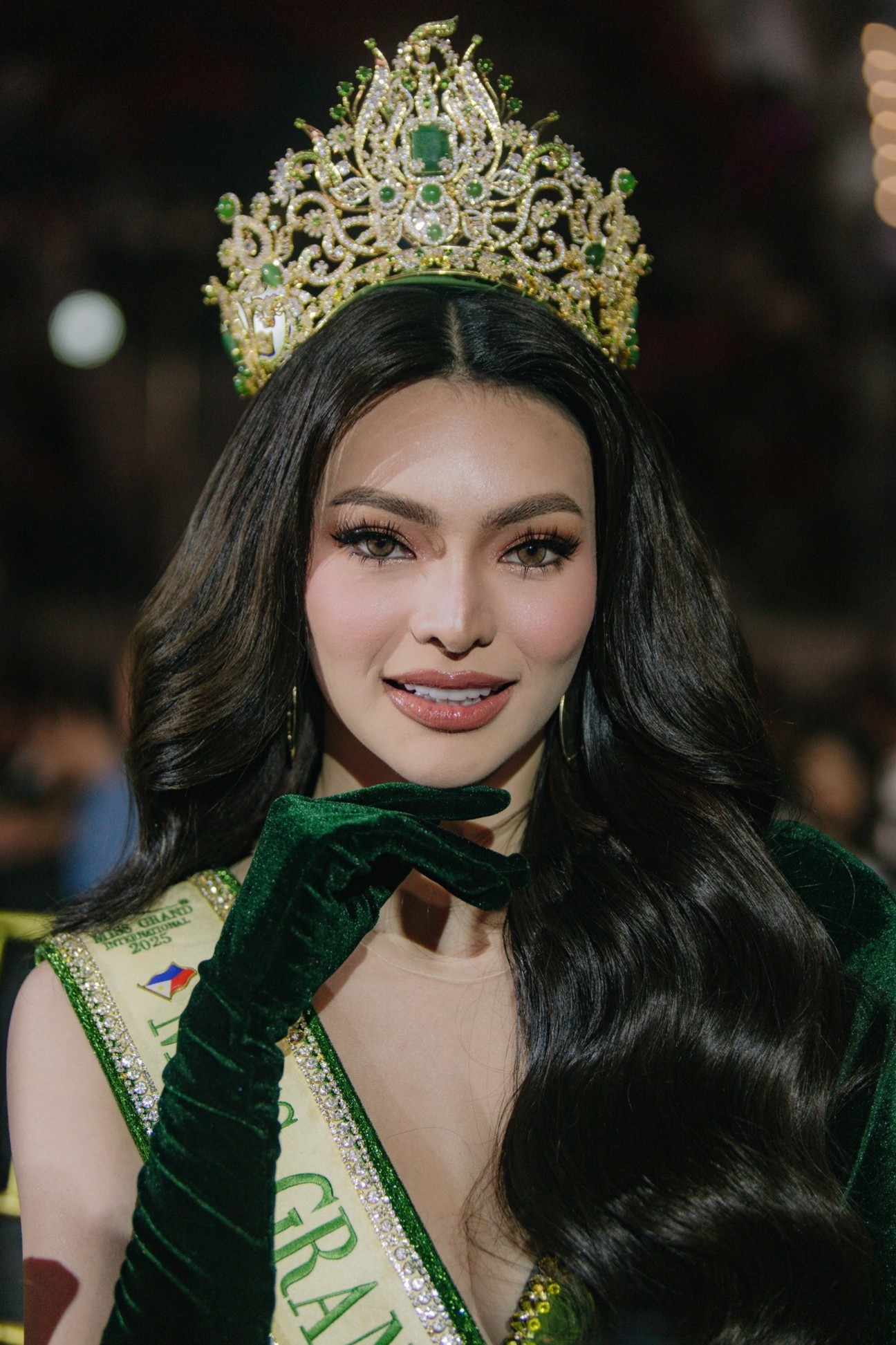
The fifth edition of the golden crown, as worn by Miss Grand International 2025, Emma Tiglao

== Recent titleholders ==
Edition (Year)	Represented	Miss Grand International	National Title	Location	Number of Entrants
14th (2026)	Tanzania	Jihan Dimack	Miss Grand Tanzania 2026	Bangkok, Thailand	77
13th (2025)	Philippines	Emma Tiglao	Miss Grand Philippines 2025	Bangkok, Thailand	77
12th (2024)	Philippines	CJ Opiaza	Miss Grand Philippines 2024	Bangkok, Thailand	68
11th (2023)	Peru	Luciana Fuster	Miss Grand Peru 2023	Ho Chi Minh City, Vietnam	69
10th (2022)	Brazil	Isabella Menin	Miss Grand Brazil 2022	West Java, Indonesia	68

Winners gallery

Miss Grand International 2026
Jihan Dimack
Tanzania

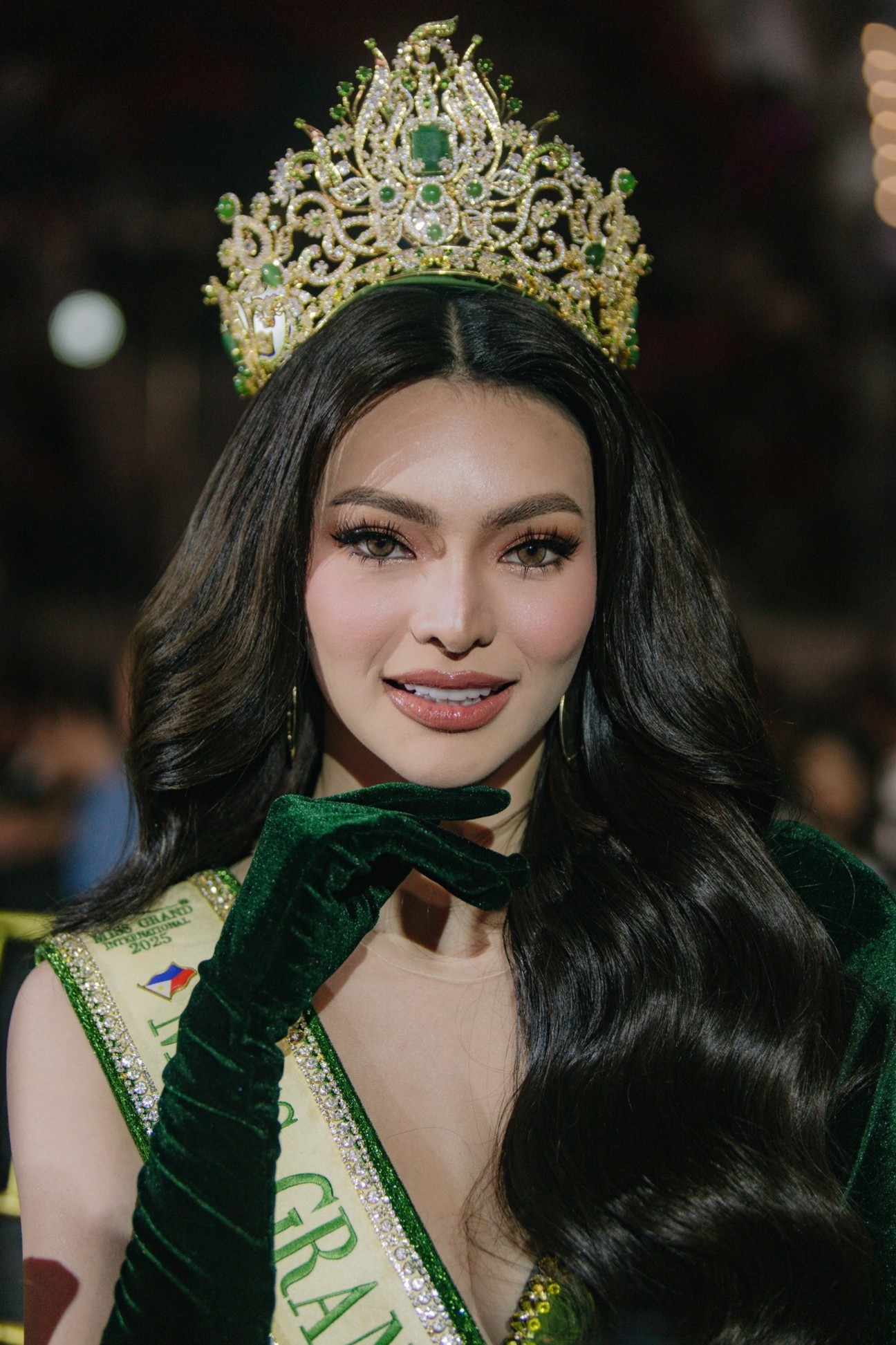
Miss Grand International 2025
Emma Tiglao
Philippines

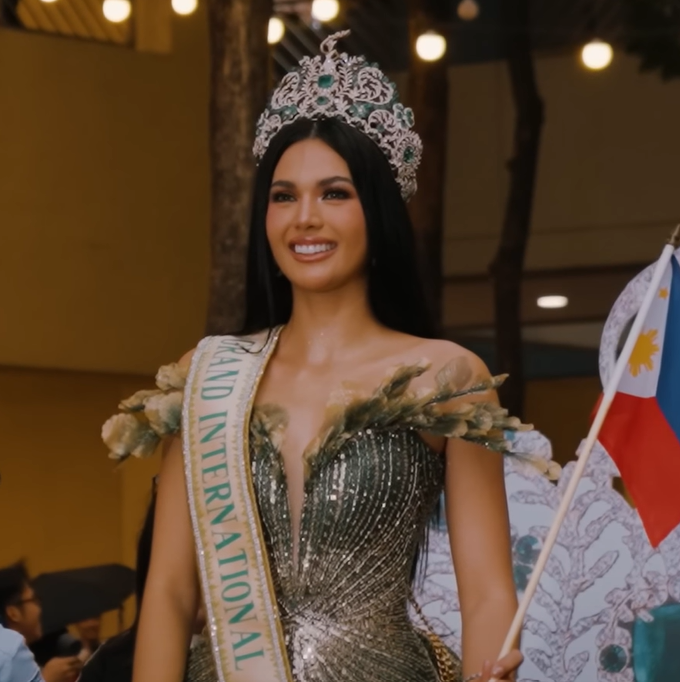
Miss Grand International 2024
CJ Opiaza
Philippines

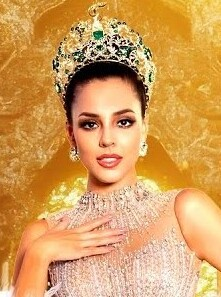
Miss Grand International 2023
Luciana Fuster
Peru

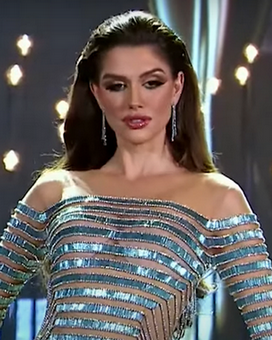
Miss Grand International 2022
Isabella Menin
Brazil

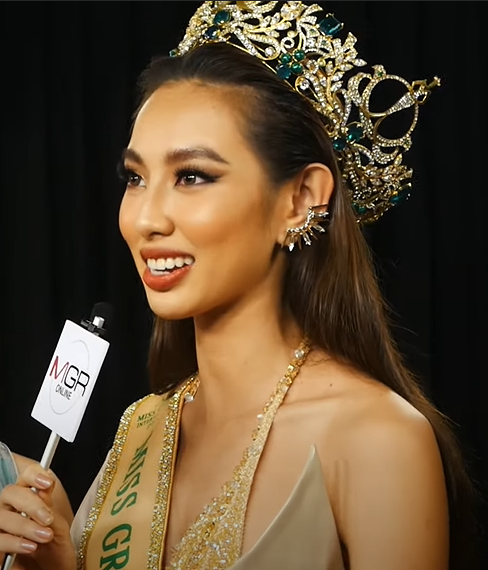
Miss Grand International 2021
Nguyễn Thúc Thùy Tiên
Vietnam

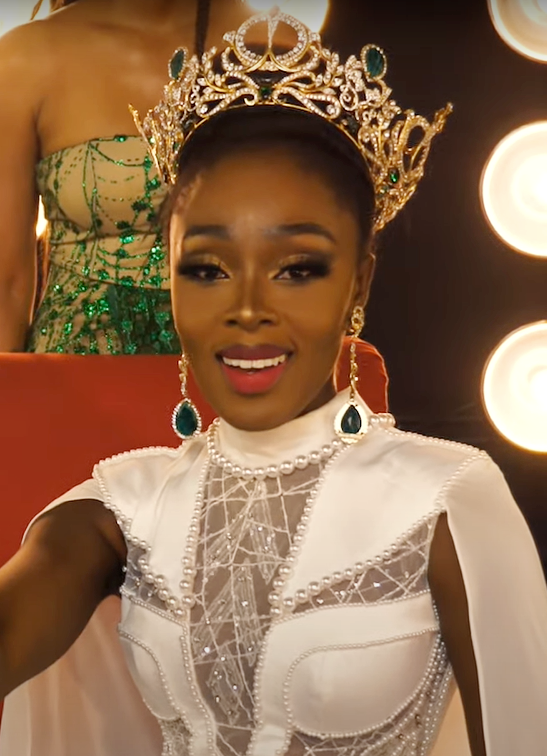
Miss Grand International 2020
Abena Appiah
United States

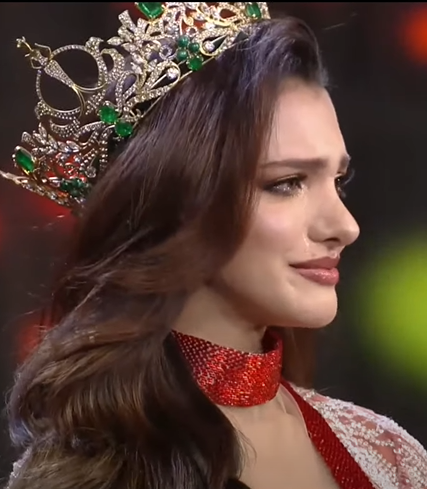
Miss Grand International 2019
Valentina Figuera
Venezuela

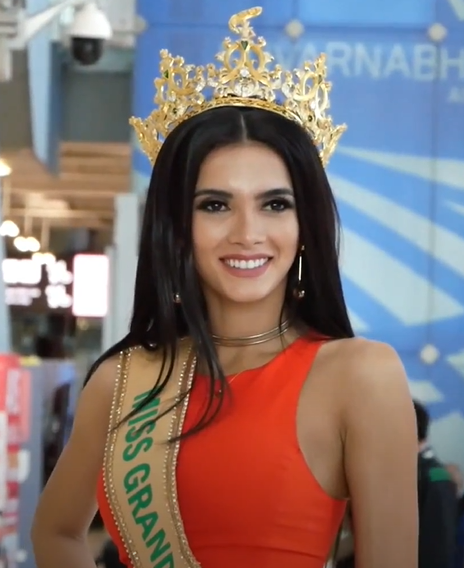
Miss Grand International 2018
Clara Sosa
Paraguay

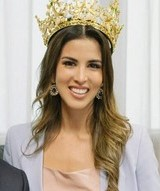
Miss Grand International 2017
María José Lora
Peru

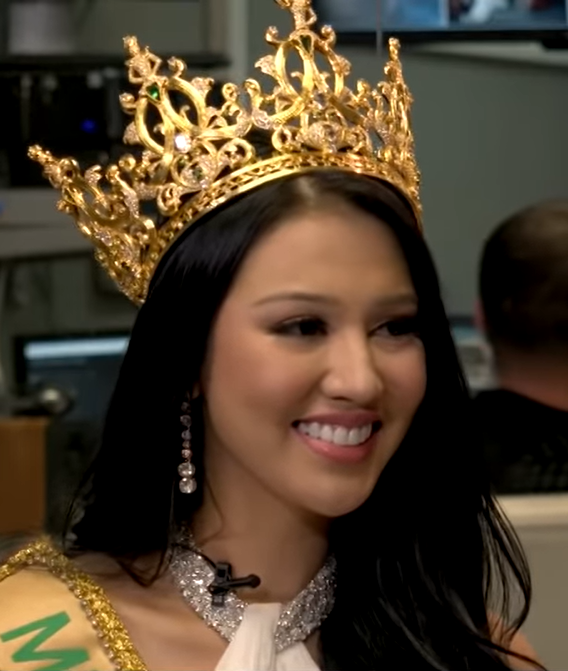
Miss Grand International 2016
Ariska Putri Pertiwi
Indonesia

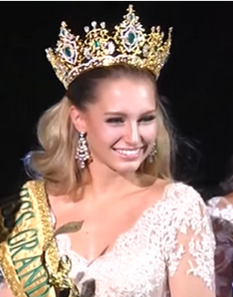
Miss Grand International 2015
Claire Elizabeth Parker
Australia

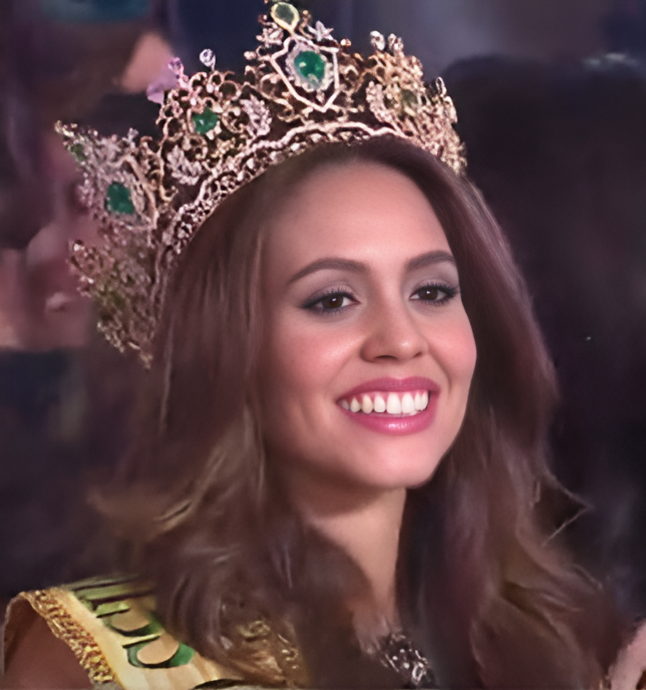
Miss Grand International 2014
Daryanne Lees
Cuba

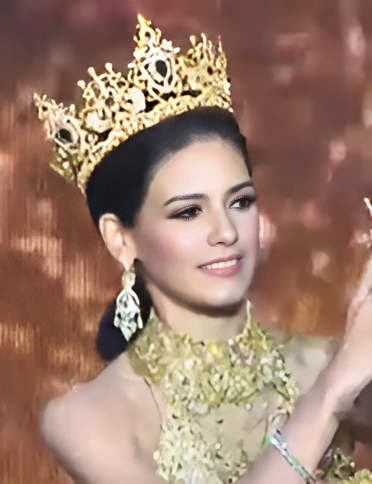
Miss Grand International 2013
Janelee Chaparro
Puerto Rico

== Miss Grand national pageants ==
In addition to Thailand, several national licensees have been separately organizing their preliminary pageants to select the representatives for the Miss Grand International pageant. As listed below, the lists were divided into four geographic continent groups, including; Africa, the Americas, Asia-Oceania, and Europe.

Legend

Active: The most recent titleholder was chosen through the Miss Grand National pageant.
Inactive: Miss Grand National pageant was defunct, the current titleholder was appointed without organizing any contest, or no representative
Merged: Miss Grand National pageant was merged into other pageants, and one of those pageants' finalists was elected Miss Grand titleholder
Projected: Miss Grand National pageant was supposed to be held in the year mentioned.

Pageant	Continent group	First edition	Status	Note
Miss Grand Angola	Africa	2023	Active	Organized annually since 2023.
Miss Grand Botswana	Africa	2014	Inactive	Held only once in 2014, by a South Africa-based businessperson, Dineo Matlapeng.
Miss Grand Ghana	Africa	2020	Active	Separately organized 2 times; in 2020 by Legacy Pageants Limited, and another in 2022 by Akuaba Entertainment.
Miss Grand Ivory Coast	Africa	2022	Active	
Miss Grand Kenya	Africa	2024	Active	
Miss Grand Liberia	Africa	2021	Inactive	Due to the COVID-19 outbreak, the pageant was held virtually.
Miss Grand Namibia	Africa	2015	Inactive	Held as a stand-alone contest three times during 2015 – 2018, by Magnolia Events Management (ML Events Artistry).
Miss Grand Nigeria	Africa	2015	Merged	Individually organized twice, in 2015 and 2016. Since 2020, the titleholder has been determined through The Nigerian Queen pageant.
Miss Grand Congo (RDC)	Africa	2025	Active	
Miss Grand South Africa	Africa	2015	Active	Held annually since 2015 by different organizers.
Miss Grand Tanzania	Africa	2017	Active	First organized in 2017, by Rasheedah Jamaldin, and then by Nazimizye Mdolo since 2024.
Miss Grand Zimbabwe	Africa	2013	Inactive	Held once in 2013 by Samantha Tshuma.
Miss Grand Australia	Asia and Oceania	2014	Active	Held annually since 2014, by different organizers.
Miss Grand Cambodia	Asia and Oceania	2015	Active	Separately organized annually since 2015. Its first five editions (2015 – 2019) was arranged under the direction of Boonkerd Angamnuaysiri. Since 2020, the license has belonged to Mohahang Production.
Miss Grand China	Asia and Oceania	2024	Active	First organized in 2024 by Shengyu Xinghui Wenhua Chuanbo Ltd.
Miss Grand Hong Kong	Asia and Oceania	2023	Active	
Miss Grand India	Asia and Oceania	2023	Active	Since the Glamand Group acquired the Miss Grand India franchise in 2022, the first stand-alone edition of the pageant was held in 2023.
Miss Grand Indonesia	Asia and Oceania	2015	Merged	Held as a stand-alone contest 3 times during 2018 – 2020. Beginning in 2023, the winner of a newly established national beauty contest, Miss Mega Bintang Indonesia, will be assumed to be Miss Grand Indonesia.
Miss Grand Japan	Asia and Oceania	2015	Active	Held annually since 2015, by Eriko Yoshi.
Miss Grand Korea	Asia and Oceania	2017	Active	Held annually since 2017 by different organizers.
Miss Grand Laos	Asia and Oceania	2017	Active	Held individually 3 times, in 2017, 2018, and 2022.
Miss Grand Macau	Asia and Oceania	2025	Active	
Miss Grand Malaysia	Asia and Oceania	2013	Active	Held annually since 2013 by three different organizers.
Miss Grand Myanmar	Asia and Oceania	2016	Active	Held twice in 2016 by Style Plus H. and 2024 by Glamorous International.
Miss Grand Nepal	Asia and Oceania	2016	Merged	Held annually from 2016 to 2022 by three different organizers. Since 2023, the representatives have been elected via Miss Vibhaa pageant.
Miss Grand Philippines	Asia and Oceania	2014	Active	During 2015–2022, the franchise belonged to the Binibining Pilipinas.
Miss Grand Sri Lanka	Asia and Oceania	2016	Active	Held in 2016, 2018 and 2025.
Miss Grand Thailand	Asia and Oceania	2013	Active	Held annually since 2013.
Miss Grand Vietnam	Asia and Oceania	2022	Active	Held annually since 2022, by Sen Vang Entertainment.
Miss Grand Albania	Europe	2014	Inactive	Held in parallel with Miss Grand Kosovo from 2014 to 2018, then was separated into a stand-alone contest in 2019.
Miss Grand Belgium	Europe	2021	Active	Under the direction of Carolyn Collinda, the contest was organized twice, in 2021 and 2022.
Miss Grand France	Europe	2019	Active	Held annually since 2019.
Miss Grand Italy	Europe	2019	Active	Held annually since 2019, by Giuseppe Puzio.
Miss Grand Kosovo	Europe	2014	Inactive	Held in parallel with Miss Grand Albania from 2014 to 2018, then was separated into a stand-alone contest in 2019.
Miss Grand Netherlands	Europe	2016	Active	Held as a stand-alone pageant in 2016 – 2018. The other titleholders were determined through either the Miss Supranational Netherlands (2014 – 2015) or the 12 Months of Beauty (2020 and 2022) pageants.
Miss Grand Spain	Europe	2016	Active	Under the management of Vicente Gonzalez, the pageant has been organized as a stand-alone pageant since 2016.
Miss Grand United Kingdom	Europe	2015	Inactive	Held sin 2015 by Holly Louise, in 2021 by Megan Darlington, and from 2023 by Kathryn Fanshawe.
Miss Grand Bahamas	North America	2018	Inactive	Held only once in 2018, by Navado Dawkins.
Miss Grand Canada	North America	2017	Merged	Separately organized three times; in 2017 and 2018 by Di Benedetto Models agency, and another in 2021 by the Pageant Group Canada Inc. The country delegates for the Miss Grand International pageant have been selected via the Miss World Canada competition since 2022.
Miss Grand Costa Rica	North America	2022	Active	Held once in 2022 by the Concurso Nacional de Belleza de Costa Rica (CNB Costa Rica).
Miss Grand Cuba	North America	2023	Active	Organized once in 2023 by Daryanne Lees.
Miss Grand Curaçao	North America	2014	Inactive	Held as a separate pageant only once in 2014, by the Señorita Curaçao organization.
Miss Grand Dominican Republic	North America	2016	Active	Held in 2016 by Chantel Martinez, the first runner-up Miss Grand International 2013. and became active again in 2025.
Miss Grand El Salvador	North America	2023	Merged	Held once in 2023. In 2024, the annual Reina de El Salvador pageant winner automatically assumed Miss Grand El Salvador.
Miss Grand Honduras	North America	2022	Inactive	First organized in 2022 to determine country representative for the 2022 and 2023 editions of Miss Grand International.
Miss Grand Mexico	North America	2023	Merged	Held once in 2023 by Falsiorli Org. Since 2024, the representatives have been elected via the Mexicana Universal pageant.
Miss Grand Nicaragua	North America	2021	Active	Organized individually once in 2021 by Saúl Benítez, to elect the winners for the 2021 and 2022 editions of Miss Grand International.
Miss Grand United States	North America	2016	Active	Held annually since 2016.
Miss Grand US Virgin Islands	North America	2024	Active	
Miss Grand Argentina	South America	2025	Active	
Miss Grand Brazil	South America	2014	Active	Held annually since 2014.
Miss Grand Chile	South America	2017	Inactive	Organized annually since 2017 by different organizers.
Miss Grand Colombia	South America	2018	Active	Held individually twice; in 2018 by Top 3 Latam, and 2022 by César Prado.
Miss Grand Curaçao	South America	2014	Active	
Miss Grand Ecuador	South America	2021	Merged	Held separately in 2021 and 2023 by Tahiz Panuz, the president of the CNB Ecuador. In 2024, the representative was elected via the Concurso Nacional de Belleza Ecuador pageant.
Miss Grand Paraguay	South America	2017	Active	Separately held annually since 2017, by Mygami Producciones SRL.
Miss Grand Peru	South America	2023	Active	The first edition was expected to happen in mid-2023.
Miss Grand Trinidad and Tobago	South America	2023	Active	
Miss Grand Venezuela	South America	2022	Active	First organized in 2022 to determined the country representative for Miss Grand International 2023.

== Participating countries and territories ==
National franchises have a lot of latitude in choosing candidates for Miss Grand International. Some are the winners of individual contests for their Miss Grand International, others get the honor by winning first or second runner-up from contests for candidates to multiple international pageants, and yet others are chosen in different ways.

The following is the list of Miss Grand International participating countries and territories, the competition result, as well as the national licensee entities since 2013. The list was divided into 6 groups based on the geographic continents.

=== Africa ===
Color key:
Declared as the winner	10 Top 10 finalists	C Withdrew during the competition
First runner-up	20 Top 20 finalists	R Representative determined but did not compete
Second runner-up	Y Unplaced	N No representative
Third runner-up
Fourth runner-up

Miss Grand national licensees in African countries
Country/territory
Year of participation

Year	'0	'1	'2	'3	'4	'5	'6	'7	'8	'9

Licensee

Algeria	2010s / No pageant / / / Y / R / R / N / N / N / N; 2020s / N / N / N / N / N / N	Current: — Former licensee: 2013 – 2015: Miss Algeria Organization
Angola	2010s / No pageant / / / N / N / 20 / N / N / N / N; 2020s / N / 20 / Y / 10 / Y / Y	Current: Márcia de Menezes (2021 – present) Former licensees: 2015: Meriam Kaxuxwena
Botswana	2010s / No pageant / / / N / Y / N / N / N / N / N; 2020s / N / N / N / N / N / N	Current: — Former licensees: 2014: Dineo Matlapeng
Cameroon	2010s / No pageant / / / R / Y / N / R / N / N / N; 2020s / N / N / N / N / Y / R	Current: — Former licensees: 2013: Marie Cecile Olga Mengue Essouma; 2014 – 2016: Miss Prestige Cameroun Organization; 2024: Cameroon Pageant Academy (Enanga Ndolo Mbesa)
Cape Verde	2010s / No pageant / / / N / N / N / N / N / Y / N; 2020s / N / N / N / N / N / N	Current: — Former licensees: 2018: Priscilla Gomes
Congo, Democratic Republic of the	2010s / No pageant / / / N / R / N / N / N / N / N; 2020s / N / N / R / N / N / N	Current: — Former licensees: 2014: Naise Gumanda; 2022: Caroline Kondé
Egypt	2010s / No pageant / / / Y / N / Y / Y / Y / N / Y; 2020s / Y / Y / N / Y / Y / Y	Current: Miss Egypt (2013, 2015 – 2017, 2019 – 2021, 2023 – present) Former licensees: No former licensee
Ethiopia	2010s / No pageant / / / Y / / Y / Y / Y / N / N; 2020s / N / N / N / N / N / N	Current: — Former licensees: 2013 – 2017: Miss Ethiopia Organization
Gabon	2010s / No pageant / / / R / N / N / N / N / N / N; 2020s / N / N / N / N / N / N	Current: — Former licensees: 2013: Mbou Wouono Henriette
Ghana	2010s / No pageant / / / N / N / Y / N / N / Y / N; 2020s / R / N / Y / Y / Y	Current: Abena Appiah (2022 – present) Former licensees: 2015 – 2016: Charlee Berbicks; 2018: Oklepeme Foundation; 2020: Legacy Pageants Ltd.
Guinea	2010s / No pageant / / / Y / N / N / N / N / N / N; 2020s / N / N / N / N / N / N	Current: — Former licensees: 2013: Jasmine Sjöberg Sidibe
Ivory Coast	2010s / No pageant / / / N / Y / N / N / N / N / N; 2020s / N / N / N / N / Y / N	Current: — Former licensees: 2014: Richlove Amissah; 2024: Robles Yanez
Kenya	2010s / No pageant / / / Y / N / Y / N / N / N / N; 2020s / 20 / N / N / N / N / R	Current: — Former licensees: 2013: Beauties of Africa Organization; 2015: Miss Earth Kenya Organization; 2020: Irene Mukii; 2024 – 2025: The Drop Brands
Liberia	2010s / No pageant / / / N / N / N / N / N / N / N; 2020s / N / Y / N / N / N / N	Current: — Former licensees: 2021: Miss Grand Liberia Org.
Mauritius	2010s / No pageant / / / N / Y / N / Y / N / N / Y; 2020s / Y / Y / 10 / N / N / N	Current: — Former licensees: 2014: Miss India Worldwide Mauritius Organization; 2016: Miss Supranational Mauritius Organization; 2019 – 2022: Ahmad Abbas
Mozambique	2010s / No pageant / / / N / N / N / N / N / N / N; 2020s / N / N / Y / N / N / N	Current: — Former licensees: 2022: Pinto Música
Namibia	2010s / No pageant / / / Y / R / Y / R / R / R / N; 2020s / N / N / N / N / N / N	Current: — Former licensees: 2013 – 2014: Beauties of Africa Inc.; 2015 – 2018: Magnolia Events Management (By Magnolia Kuhanga)
Nigeria	2010s / No pageant / / / R / Y / Y / Y / Y / N / Y; 2020s / Y / 20 / 20 / 20 / Y / Y	Current: Corporate Hostess and Modeling Service (2025 – present) Former licensees: 2013 – 2014, 2019: Miss Earth Nigeria Organization; 2015 – 2017: Miss Grand Nigeria Organization (By Loveth Ajufoh); 2020 – 2022: The Nigerian Queen Org.; 2023 – 2024: The Qhue Group
Réunion	2010s / No pageant / / / N / N / N / N / N / N / Y; 2020s / N / N / N / N / N / N	Current: — Former licensees: 2019: Laëtitia Hoareau-Boyer
Rwanda	2010s / No pageant / / / N / N / N / Y / N / N / N; 2020s / N / N / N / N / N / N	Current: — Former licensees: 2016: Sonia Gisa
Seychelles	2010s / No pageant / / / N / N / N / N / N / N / N; 2020s / N / N / N / Y / N / N	Current: — Former licensees: 2023: Gabriella Gonthier
Sierra Leone	2010s / No pageant / / / N / N / N / N / Y / Y / N; 2020s / N / N / N / N / N / N	Current: — Former licensees: 2017 – 2018: IAMSL Pageant Agency
South Africa	2010s / No pageant / / N / R / Y / Y / Y / Y / 20; 2020s / Y / Y / Y / Y / Y	Current: Maggy Dee Productions (2016 – Present) Former licensees: 2015: Reinhardt Drewel Foundation
South Sudan	2010s / No pageant / / / N / Y / Y / Y / 10 / N / N; 2020s / N / N / N / R / N / N	Current: — Former licensees: 2014 – 2017: Atong Demach; 2023: Amelia Deng
Tanzania	2010s / No pageant / / / N / Y / N / N / Y / Y / N; 2020s / N / N / N / N / Y / 10	Current: Avil and Minazi Entertainment Ltd. (2024 – Present) Former licensees: 2014 – 2015: Miss Tanzania Organization; 2017 – 2018: Rasheedah Jamaldin
Tunisia	2010s / No pageant / / / N / N / Y / N / N / N / N; 2020s / N / N / N / N / N / N	Current: — Former licensees: 2015: Miss Tunisie Organization
Uganda	2010s / No pageant / / / Y / N / Y / N / Y / N / N; 2020s / N / N / Y / N / N / N	Current: — Former licensees: 2013, 2015, 2017: Afrost Uganda Marketing Ltd.; 2022: Oliver Nakakande Foundation
Zambia	2010s / No pageant / / / N / N / N / N / N / Y / R; 2020s / N / N / N / N / N / 20	Current: Arm Model Management Zambia (2025 – Present) Former licensees: 2018 – 2019: Isabel Chikoti
Zimbabwe	2010s / No pageant / / / 20 / Y / N / N / N / N / N; 2020s / N / N / N / N / N / Y	Current: Ntombifuthi Gumede Tumi Jaine (2025 – Present) Former licensees: 2013: Samantha Tshuma; 2014: Chris Vukani Mhlanga

=== Asia ===
Color key:
Declared as the winner	10 Top 10 finalists	C Withdrew during the competition
First runner-up	20 Top 20 finalists	R Representative determined but did not compete
Second runner-up	Y Unplaced	N No representative
Third runner-up
Fourth runner-up

Miss Grand national licensees in Asian countries
Country/territory
Year of participation

Year	'0	'1	'2	'3	'4	'5	'6	'7	'8	'9

Licensee

Armenia	2010s / No pageant / / / N / N / N / N / N / N / Y; 2020s / N / Y / N / N / Y / Y	Current: Miss Yerevan Production (2024 – present) Former licensee: 2019: Janna Gregory; 2021: Miss Armenia Org.
Bangladesh	2010s / No pageant / / / N / R / R / N / N / N / N; 2020s / N / Y / Y / N / Y / N	Current: – Former licensees: 2014 – 2015: Miss Bangladesh Organization; 2021 – 2022: Hiam Amani Hafizuddin; 2024: Glamanand Entertainment Pvt. Ltd.
Bashkortostan	2010s / No pageant / / / N / N / N / N / N / N / Y; 2020s / Y / N / N / N / N / N	Current: – Former licensees: 2019 – 2020: Miss Bash Models Agency
Cambodia	2010s / No pageant / / / R / Y / Y / R / Y / Y / R; 2020s / 20 / 10 / 10 / Y / C / N	Current: – Former licensees: 2013: Chan Srey Neang; 2014 – 2019: Boonkerd Angamnuaysiri; 2020 – 2022: Phalitakam Mohahang Co., Ltd (Mohahang Production); 2023 – 2024: HK7 Co., Ltd. (Sokunthea Im)
China	2010s / No pageant / / / 20 / Y / Y / Y / 20 / Y / Y; 2020s / Y / R / Y / N / Y / Y	Current: ShengYu XingHui Culture Communications Co., Ltd. (2024 – present) Former licensees: 2013 – 2019: Guangzhou Zhoumeng Marketing Co., Ltd.; 2020 – 2021: Xin Fu Lai Enterprise Management Co., Ltd.; 2022: Shirley Yu
Georgia	2010s / No pageant / / / Y / N / N / N / N / N / N; 2020s / N / N / N / N / N / Y	Current: – Former licensees: 2013: IC Model Management
Hong Kong	2010s / No pageant / / / N / Y / Y / Y / Y / Y / N; 2020s / N / Y / Y / Y / Y / Y	Current: Chan Mei To (2023 – Present) Former licensees: 2014 – 2015: Laura Li; 2016 – 2018: Adam Lee; 2021: Xin Fu Lai Enterprise Management Co., Ltd.; 2022: Sasha Wasee
India	2010s / No pageant / / / Y / Y / / Y / 20 / Y; 2020s / Y / 20 / Y / 20 / / Y	Current: Star Entertainment Production (Akanksha Thakur) (2025 – present) Former licensees: 2013 – 2014: Indian Princess Organization; 2015 – 2019, 2021: The Times Group; 2020, 2022 – 2024: Glamanand Entertainment Pvt. Ltd.
Indonesia	2010s / No pageant / Y / 10 / Y / 10 / Y; 2020s / 10 / 10 / 10 / 20	Current: – Former licensees: 2013, 2016 – 2017: Yayasan Puteri Indonesia; 2014 – 2015: El John Pageants; 2018 – 2019: Dharma Gantari Foundation; 2020 – 2024: Yayasan Dunia Mega Bintang – Ivan Gunawan
Iran	2010s / No pageant / / / N / Y / Y / N / N / N / N; 2020s / Y / N / N / N / N / N	Current: – Former licensee: 2014 – 2015, 2020: Miss Iran Organization
Iraq	2010s / No pageant / / / N / N / N / Y / N / N / N; 2020s / N / N / N / N / N / N	Current: – Former licensee: 2016: Klaodia Khalaf
Israel	2010s / No pageant / / / R / 20 / Y / N / N / N / N; 2020s / N / N / N / N / N / N	Current:– Former licensee: 2013 – 2015: Yael Markovich
Japan	2010s / No pageant / / / Y / 20 / 10 / Y / Y / 20; 2020s / 20 / Y / Y / Y / 20 / 20	Current: Eriko Inoda (2016 – Present) Former licensee: 2013 – 2015: Stephen I. Diáz
Kazakhstan	2010s / No pageant / / / Y / Y / N / N / N / 20 / N; 2020s / N / N / N / N / N / Y	Current: – Former licensee: 2013 – 2015: Miss Grand Kazakhstan Organization (By AIM Studio); 2018: Miss Tourism Russia Organization
Kurdistan	2010s / No pageant / / / N / Y / C / N / N / N / N; 2020s / N / N / N / N / N / N	Current: – Former licensees: 2014 – 2015: Dalia Rebwar Hassan
Kyrgyzstan	2010s / No pageant / / / N / R / N / N / N / N / N; 2020s / N / N / R / N / N / Y	Current: – Former licensees: 2022: Miss Kyrgyzstan
Laos	2010s / No pageant / / / N / N / N / N / 20 / Y / R; 2020s / Y / Y / Y / 20 / Y / 20	Current: Thepmahavixay Saythilath (2024 – Present) Former licensees: 2017: Hongkham Souvannavong (Miss Laos Ltd.); 2018 – 2023: Saikeo Sidavong
Lebanon	2010s / No pageant / / / Y / Y / N / N / Y / Y / Y; 2020s / N / N / N / N / N / N	Current: – Former licensee: 2013 – 2019: Al-Sawsan International Foundation
Macau	2010s / No pageant / / / Y / Y / Y / 10 / Y / Y / Y; 2020s / N / N / N / N / Y / Y	Current: Carry Xie (Lu Xingdan) (2024 – present) Former licensee: 2013 – 2019: Macau Pageant Alliance
Malaysia	2010s / No pageant / / / Y / Y / Y / 20 / Y / Y / Y; 2020s / 10 / 20 / Y / Y / 20 / Y	Current: HyperLive Entertainment Pte Ltd. (2022–present) Former licensee: 2013 – 2014: Anson Chong; 2015 – 2021: Introducing Malaysia
Mongolia	2010s / No pageant / / / Y / Y / Y / N / Y / N / N; 2020s / N / N / Y / N / N / N	Current: – Former licensee: 2013 – 2015, 2017 – 2018: Miss World Mongolia Organization; 2022: Anton Sergeevi
Myanmar	2010s / No pageant / / / 20 / Y / Y / Y / Y / Y / Y; 2020s / 20 / 20 / Y / / / Y	Current: Mr. Maran Seng Naw (2025 – Present) Former licensee: 2013 – 2014: Miss Golden Land Myanmar Organization; 2015 – 2016: Style Plus H; 2017 – 2020: Miss Universe Myanmar Organization; 2021 – 2024: Glamorous International
Nepal	2010s / No pageant / / / Y / Y / Y / N / Y / Y / Y; 2020s / Y / Y / Y / Y / Y / Y	Current: Umanga Creation Pvt. Ltd (2023 – Present) Former licensee: 2013 – 2016: Looks Entertainment Pvt. Ltd. (Mero Looks); 2017 – 2019: RK Entertainment Group; 2020 – 2022: Izodom Nepal & Cosmo Group
Pakistan	2010s / No pageant / / / Y / Y / N / N / N / N / N; 2020s / N / Y / Y / N / Y / N	Current: Hiam Amani Hafizuddin (2021 – 2022, 2024 – Present) Former licensees: 2013 – 2014: Miss Pakistan World Organization
Palestine	2010s / No pageant / / / N / N / N / N / N / N / N; 2020s / N / N / N / N / N / Y	Current: – Former licensees
Philippines	2010s / No pageant / / / Y / Y / Y; 2020s / Y / 10 / Y	Current: ALV Pageant Circle (2023 – Present) Former licensees: 2013 – 2014: Miss Grand Philippines Org. (By John Dela Vega); 2015 – 2022: Stella Márquez-Araneta
Siberia	2010s / No pageant / / / N / N / N / N / N / N / N; 2020s / N / Y / N / N / N / N	Current: – Former licensees: 2021: Anton Sergeevi
Singapore	2010s / No pageant / / / C / Y / Y / Y / R / R / N; 2020s / N / N / Y / Y / Y / Y	Current: AO Venture Pte Ltd (2023 – present) Former licensees: 2013: Miss Singapore World Organization; 2014: Islandia Group Limited; 2015 – 2018: ERM Singapore Marketing Group; 2022: Iqmal Muhammad
South Korea	2010s / No pageant / / / Y / Y / Y / 10 / Y / Y / R; 2020s / Y / Y / Y / Y / Y / Y	Current: Choo Miyung (2024 – Present) Former licensees: 2013 – 2015: Ronaldo Soriano Trono; 2016 – 2019: 1L2H Ltd.; 2020 – 2023: Korea Premium Brand Association
Sri Lanka	2010s / No pageant / / / 10 / 20 / 10 / Y / Y / 20 / N; 2020s / Y / Y / Y / C / N / Y	Current: – Former licensees: 2013 – 2023: Brian Kerkoven
Taiwan	2010s / No pageant / / / N / Y / Y / Y / N / Y / N; 2020s / N / N / N / Y / Y / Y	Current: International Celebrity Pageant Group (2023 – Present) Former licensees: 2014 – 2016: Miss Chinese Taipei Organization; 2018: Tania Tan Yi Rong
Thailand	2010s / No pageant / / 20 / 10 / 10 / 20; 2020s / 10 / Y / 10 / 20	Current: Nawat Itsaragrisil (2013 – Present) Former licensees: No former licensee
Turkey	2010s / No pageant / / / N / N / N / Y / N / N / N; 2020s / N / N / Y / Y / N / Y	Current: – Former licensees: 2016: Diana Osypenko; 2022: Özcan Yılmaz Agency Model; 2023: Miss Aura International (Adnan Seker)
Turkmenistan	2010s / No pageant / / / Y / N / N / N / N / N / N; 2020s / N / N / N / N / N / N	Current: – Former licensees: 2013: Natalia Vasileva
Uzbekistan	2010s / No pageant / / / N / N / N / N / N / N / N; 2020s / N / N / N / 20 / N / N	Current: – Former licensees: 2023: Olinda Cho 卓猷燕
Vietnam	2010s / No pageant / / Y / Y / Y / 20 / 10 / 10 / 10; 2020s / 20 / 20 / / Y / Y	Current: Senvang Entertainment (2018 – Present) Former licensees: 2013 – 2014: MGI Invitation; 2015 – 2017: Elite Model International

=== Europe ===
Color key:
Declared as the winner	10 Top 10 finalists	C Withdrew during the competition
First runner-up	20 Top 20 finalists	R Representative determined but did not compete
Second runner-up	Y Unplaced	N No representative
Third runner-up
Fourth runner-up

Miss Grand national licensees in European countries
Country/territory
Year of participation

Year	'0	'1	'2	'3	'4	'5	'6	'7	'8	'9

Licensee

Albania	2010s / No pageant / / / R / Y / Y / R / R / Y / Y; 2020s / Y / R / N / Y / Y / Y	Current: Exclusive Management (mga) (2023 – present) Former licensee: 2013: Dajana Luga; 2014 – 2015: Sherif Pacolli; 2016: Paula Preçi; 2017: Klaudia Kalia; 2018 - 2021: Aleks Tanushi
Belarus	2010s / No pageant / / / R / N / Y / N / Y / N / Y; 2020s / Y / N / Y / Y / N / N	Current: — Former licensee: 2013: Veronika Chachyna; 2015: Luliia Kuper; 2017: Panova Denisovna; 2022: Anton Sergeevi; 2019 – 2020, 2023: Miss Queen Belarus
Belgium	2010s / No pageant / / / Y / Y / Y / Y / Y / Y / N; 2020s / N / Y / Y / Y / Y / 20	Current: Carolyn Collinda (CC Production) (2021 – Present) Former licensee: 2013: Miss Exclusive Belgium Org.; 2014 – 2015: Annick Eycken; 2016 – 2017: Miss Toerisme Organisatie Benelux; 2018: Elisabeth Moszkowicz
Bosnia and Herzegovina	2010s / No pageant / / / N / Y / N / N / N / N / N; 2020s / N / N / N / N / N / N	Current: — Former licensee: 2014: Alma Jasić
Bulgaria	2010s / No pageant / / / N / N / Y / N / Y / Y / Y; 2020s / Y / N / N / N / N / N	Current: — Former licensee: 2015, 2017 – 2020: Bok Star Models
Crimea	2010s / No pageant / / / R / N / N / N / N / N / N; 2020s / Y / N / Y / N / N / N	Current: — Former licensee: 2013: Kateruna Romanovna Gubrienko; 2020: Anton Sergeevi; 2022: Sasha Waseem
Czech Republic	2010s / No pageant / / Y / Y / 20 / Y / Y / 20; 2020s / 10 / Y / 20 / Y / 10	Current: Miss Czech Republic Org. (2015 – present) Former licensee: 2013 – 2014: Czech Miss Organization
Denmark	2010s / No pageant / / / C / N / Y / Y / Y / Y / N; 2020s / N / N / 20 / Y / Y / Y	Current: Miss Danmark Organization (2018, 2022 – present) Former licensee: 2013, 2015 – 2017: Miss Queen of Scandinavia Organization
England	2010s / No pageant / / / Y / N / Y / Y / Y / Y / R; 2020s / 20 / R / N / N / N / N	Current: – Former licensees: 2013: Miss United Kingdom Organization; 2015: Elizabeth Greenham; 2016 – 2019: Pageant Girl Ltd.; 2020 – 2021: Megan Darlington
Estonia	2010s / No pageant / / / Y / Y / Y / Y / Y / Y / Y; 2020s / N / N / N / N / N / N	Current: — Former licensee: 2013 – 2019: Miss Queen of Scandinavia Organization
Finland	2010s / No pageant / / / Y / Y / N / N / Y / Y / N; 2020s / Y / N / N / N / N / N	Current: — Former licensees: 2013 – 2018: Fashion Model Agency; 2020: Miss Queen of Scandinavia Organization
France	2010s / No pageant / / / Y / Y / 20 / Y / Y / N / Y; 2020s / Y / 20 / Y / 20 / / 20	Current: Robles Yanez (2023 – present) Former licensees: 2013 – 2014: Miss Nationale Organization; 2015 – 2017: Fashion Models Academy (By Réjane Klein Maurer); 2019 – 2020: Sonia Mansour; 2021 – 2021: No data available
Germany	2010s / No pageant / / / Y / Y / N / N / Y / Y / Y; 2020s / Y / 20 / Y / Y / Y / Y	Current: Kim Kelly Braun (2025 – present) Former licensee: 2013 – 2014, 2017 – 2018: Miss Germany Organization; 2019 - 2024: Miss From Germany (by Leandro Aponte)
Gibraltar	2010s / No pageant / / / N / N / N / N / N / N / N; 2020s / N / N / N / Y / Y / N	Current: No1 Models Gibraltar (Kelvin Hewitt) (2023 – Present) Former licensees: No former licensee
Greece	2010s / No pageant / / / Y / Y / N / N / N / N / N; 2020s / N / N / N / Y / N / N	Current: Star Hellas (Vassilis Prevelakis and Associates E.E.) (2013 – 2014, 2023 – Present) Former licensees: No former licensee
Greenland	2010s / No pageant / / / N / N / N / N / N / N / N; 2020s / N / N / N / N / Y / N	Current: Miss Danmark Organization (2024) Former licensee: 2013 – 2023: No licensee
Hungary	2010s / No pageant / / / Y / Y / Y / Y / Y / N / N; 2020s / N / N / N / N / N / Y	Current: — Former licensees: 2013: Magyarország Szépe Organization; 2014 – 2017: Miss International Hungary Organization
Iceland	2010s / No pageant / / / N / N / N / C / N / N / N; 2020s / N / N / N / N / N / Y	Current: — Former licensees: 2016: Miss Queen of Scandinavia Organization
Ireland	2010s / No pageant / / / N / N / N / N / N / N / 20; 2020s / Y / N / Y / Y / N / N	Current: — Former licensee: 2019 – 2020, 2022: Manuel Munares; 2023: Rachel Slawson
Italy	2010s / No pageant / / / Y / N / Y / Y / N / N / Y; 2020s / Y / Y / Y / Y / Y / Y	Current: MUPI SRL. (2019 – present) Former licensee: 2013: Antonio Marzano; 2015 – 2016: Venus Dea Agency (By Maurizio Ciaccio)
Kosovo	2010s / No pageant / / / Y / Y / R / R / R / Y / R; 2020s / Y / R / C / Y / Y / Y	Current: Exclusive Management (mgk) (2023 – present) Former licensees: 2013 – 2021: Sherif Pacolli; 2022: Miss Universe Kosovo
Latvia	2010s / No pageant / / / 10 / N / N / Y / N / N / Y; 2020s / N / N / N / N / R / N	Current: — Former licensees: 2013: Mis un Misters Rēzekne Organization; 2016: Meldra Rozenberga; 2019: Kate Alexeeva
Lithuania	2010s / No pageant / / / N / N / N / Y / Y / C / N; 2020s / N / N / N / N / N / N	Current: — Former licensees: 2016 – 2018: Miss Queen of Scandinavia Organization
Luxembourg	2010s / No pageant / / / N / N / N / Y / N / N / N; 2020s / N / N / N / N / N / N	Current: — Former licensees: 2016: Natascha Bintz
Malta	2010s / No pageant / / / N / Y / Y / Y / N / N / N; 2020s / N / N / N / N / N / Y	Current: — Former licensees: 2014: Face of Malta Organization; 2015: Miss Malta Organization; 2016: Miss Malta Universe Organization
Moldova	2010s / No pageant / / / Y / N / Y / Y / N / Y / N; 2020s / N / N / N / N / N / N	Current: — Former licensees: 2013 – 2018: Exclusive Events International (By Ernest Hadrian Böhm)
Montenegro	2010s / No pageant / / / R / N / N / N / N / N / N; 2020s / N / N / N / N / N / Y	Current: — Former licensees: 2013: Aleksandra Petrovic
Netherlands	2010s / No pageant / / / 20 / Y / 20 / Y / Y / 20 / Y; 2020s / Y / 20 / Y / 10 / Y / Y	Current: Stefan Hoven Lieuw Choy (2013 – Present) Former licensees: No former licensee
Northern Ireland	2010s / No pageant / / / N / N / N / N / R / N / N; 2020s / R / Y / N / N / N / N	Current: – Former licensees: 2017: Chloe Louise Davies; 2020 – 2021: Megan Darlington
North Macedonia	2010s / No pageant / / / 20 / N / Y / N / N / N / N; 2020s / N / N / N / N / N / Y	Current: — Former licensees: 2013: Miss Macedonia Organization; 2015: Dunavka Trifunovska
Norway	2010s / No pageant / / / Y / Y / Y / Y / N / Y / N; 2020s / N / N / N / N / C / N	Current: Miss Norway Organization (2013 – 2016, 2024 – Present) Former licensees: 2018: Miss Queen of Scandinavia Organization
Poland	2010s / No pageant / / / Y / 10 / 20 / Y / N / Y / Y; 2020s / Y / N / Y / Y / Y / N	Current: Miss Polonia Organization (2018 – 2020, 2022 – Present) Former licensees: 2013 – 2016: Miss Polski Organization
Portugal	2010s / No pageant / / / Y / Y / Y / 20 / Y / Y / Y; 2020s / Y / Y / Y / C / R / Y	Current: Miss Portuguesa Org. (2013 – Present) Former licensees: No former licensee
Romania	2010s / No pageant / / / Y / Y / Y / Y / N / N / Y; 2020s / N / N / N / Y / N / N	Current: — Former licensees: 2013 – 2016, 2019: Exclusive Events International (By Ernest Hadrian Böhm); 2023: Denisse Vivienne Andor
Russia	2010s / No pageant / / / Y / 10 / C / Y / 20 / 20 / Y; 2020s / Y / Y / Y / Y / Y / N	Current: Anastasiia Volkonskaia (2024 – Present) Former licensees: 2013 – 2020: Miss Tourism Russia Organization; 2021 – 2022: Anton Sergeevi; 2023: Polie Mari Manalo
Scotland	2010s / No pageant / / / R / N / Y / Y / Y / Y / R; 2020s / Y / R / N / N / N / N	Current: – Former licensees: 2013: Miss United Kingdom Organization; 2015 – 2019: Pageant Girl Ltd.; 2020 - 2021: Megan Darlington
Serbia	2010s / No pageant / / / Y / N / N / N / Y / N / N; 2020s / N / N / N / N / N / N	Current: — Former licensees: 2013, 2017: Miss Serbia Organization
Slovakia	2010s / No pageant / / / / Y / Y / Y / Y / N / N; 2020s / N / N / N / N / N / Y	Current: — Former licensees: 2013 – 2015: Jan Oklamcak; 2016 – 2017: Felvidék Szépe Organization (By Kósa Annamária)
Spain	2010s / No pageant / / / Y / Y / 10 / 20 / Y / 10 / 20; 2020s / Y / 10 / 10 / 20 / 10	Current: Vicente Gonzalez (2015 – Present) Former licensees: 2013 – 2014: Marcel Arnalot Salazar
Sweden	2010s / No pageant / / / C / Y / Y / C / Y / 20 / Y; 2020s / Y / Y / N / N / N / Y	Current: — Former licensees: 2013 – 2015: Joakim Granberg; 2016 – 2021: Miss Queen of Scandinavia Org.
Switzerland	2010s / No pageant / / / Y / N / N / Y / N / N / N; 2020s / N / N / N / Y / Y / N	Current: Fred Carl Garcia (2023 – Present) Former licensees: 2013: Miss World Switzerland Organization; 2016: Miss Suisse Francophone Organization
Tatarstan	2010s / No pageant / / / N / N / N / N / Y / Y / N; 2020s / N / N / N / N / N / N	Current: — Former licensees: 2017 – 2018: Miss Tourism Russia Organization
Ukraine	2010s / No pageant / / / C / 20 / 20 / 10 / 10 / Y / Y; 2020s / N / N / Y / 20 / C / N	Current: Queen of Ukraine Organization (2013 – 2019, 2022 – present) Former licensees: No former licensee
United Kingdom	2010s / No pageant / / / N / 20 / N / N / N / N / N; 2020s / N / N / 20 / Y / 10 / 20	Current: Katharyn Fanshawe (2022 – Present) Former licensees: 2014: Miss United Kingdom Organization
Wales	2010s / No pageant / / / Y / N / Y / 20 / Y / Y / R; 2020s / Y / R / N / N / N / N	Current: – Former licensees: 2013: Miss United Kingdom Organization; 2015 – 2019: Pageant Girl Ltd.; 2020 – 2021: Megan Darlington

=== North America ===
Color key:
Declared as the winner	10 Top 10 finalists	C Withdrew during the competition
First runner-up	20 Top 20 finalists	R Representative determined but did not compete
Second runner-up	Y Unplaced	N No representative
Third runner-up
Fourth runner-up

Miss Grand national licensees in North American countries
Country/territory
Year of participation

Year	'0	'1	'2	'3	'4	'5	'6	'7	'8	'9

Licensee

Aruba	2010s / No pageant / / / N / N / N / Y / N / N / N; 2020s / N / N / N / N / N / N	Current:- Former licensees: 2016: Miss Aruba Organization
Bahamas	2010s / No pageant / / / N / N / N / 10 / Y / R / N; 2020s / N / N / N / N / N / N	Current: – Former licensees: 2016: Miss Universe Bahamas Organization; 2017 – 2018: Navado Dawkins
Belize	2010s / No pageant / / / N / N / N / N / R / N / N; 2020s / N / N / N / N / N / N	Current: – Former licensee: 2017: Enrique De León
Bonaire	2010s / No pageant / / / N / N / N / N / N / N / N; 2020s / N / N / N / Y / N / N	Current: Miss Bonaire (2023) Former licensee: No former licensee
Canada	2010s / No pageant / / / Y / / Y / Y / Y / Y / Y; 2020s / Y / Y / Y / Y / Y / Y	Current: Pageant Group Canada INC. (Michelle Weswaldi) (2019 – present) Former licensees: 2013 – 2015: Ronaldo Soriano Trono; 2016 – 2018: Angelo Di Benedetto
Costa Rica	2010s / No pageant / / / N / Y / 10 / Y / 20 / 20 / 20; 2020s / Y / 10 / Y / Y / C / Y	Current: – Former licensees: 2014: Olais Antonio Padilla; 2015 – 2017: Reinas de Costa Rica Organization; 2018 – 2021: The Finalists (by William Rodríguez and Carlos Gutiérrez); 2022 – 2023: CNB Costa Rica
Cuba	2010s / No pageant / / / 10 / / Y / 20 / Y / 20 / Y; 2020s / Y / Y / Y / Y / Y / Y	Current: Cristian Aguiar (2024 – present) Former licensees: 2013 – 2020: Miss Cuba Organization; 2021: Vicar Abel & Miledy de los Santos; 2022: Miss y Mister Cuba Org. (by Julio César Cruz and Faddya Halabi); 2023: Daryanne Lees
Curaçao	2010s / No pageant / / / N / Y / N / N / N / N / Y; 2020s / N / Y / 20 / N / 20 / N	Current: – Former licensees: 2014: Señorita Curaçao Organization; 2019, 2021 – 2022: Miss Curaçao Organization (Aysjel Maria); 2023: No Data
Dominican Republic	2010s / No pageant / / / / Y / / Y / Y / 10 / 20; 2020s / 20 / 20 / 20 / 10 / 10 / 20	Current: Misses of Dominican Republic (by Alejandro Martinez) (2020 – 2021, 2023 – present) Former licensees: 2013, 2018 – 2019: Miss Dominican Republic Organization; 2014 – 2017: Chantel Martinez; 2022: Iconic Model Search Inc.
El Salvador	2010s / No pageant / / / Y / R / N / N / N / Y / Y; 2020s / 20 / Y / Y / Y / 20 / Y	Current: CNB El Salvador (2018 – Present) Former licensees: 2013 – 2014: Nuestra Belleza El Salvador Organization
Guadeloupe	2010s / No pageant / / / Y / N / N / N / Y / Y / Y; 2020s / N / N / N / R / N / N	Current: – Former licensees: 2013, 2017 – 2019, 2023: Miss International Guadeloupe Organization
Guatemala	2010s / No pageant / / Y / Y / Y / Y / Y / N / 20; 2020s / Y / Y / Y / 20 / 10	Current: Miss Guatemala Contest (2019 – Present) Former licensees: 2013 – 2016: Miss Guatemala Latina Organization; 2017 – 2018: Miss Guatemala Organization
Haiti	2010s / No pageant / / / R / 10 / Y / N / Y / Y / Y; 2020s / N / Y / Y / Y / Y / Y	Current: Miss Haiti Caribbean Organization (2017 – 2019, 2022 – Present) Former licensees: 2013: Cassandre Paul; 2014 – 2016: Miss Haiti Organization; 2021: Olympe S.A.
Honduras	2010s / No pageant / / / Y / N / Y / N / N / N / N; 2020s / N / Y / 20 / 20 / Y / N	Current: AV Productions (2021 – Present) Former licensees: 2013, 2015: Señorita Honduras Mundo Organization
Jamaica	2010s / No pageant / / / N / N / N / 20 / Y / Y / N; 2020s / Y / N / Y / N / N / Y	Current: – Former licensees: 2016: Dianne O. Brown; 2017 – 2018, 2020: Miss Jamaica Universe Organization; 2022 Andwar International Pageant Group
Martinique	2010s / No pageant / / / N / N / N / N / N / N / N; 2020s / N / N / N / N / N / 20	Current: – Former licensees
Mexico	2010s / No pageant / / / Y / 20 / 20 / 20 / 20 / 10; 2020s / 20 / Y / 20 / Y / 20 / 10	Current: Maria Guadalupe Jones Garay (2024 – present) Former licensees: 2013:Jesús Rábago; 2014 – 2016: Rostro de México; 2017 – 2021 Miss Mexico Organization; 2022 – 2023 Flavio Falsiroli
Nicaragua	2010s / No pageant / / / N / Y / N / Y / Y / N / Y; 2020s / Y / Y / Y / Y / Y / Y	Current: Saúl Benítez (2019 – Present) Former licensees: 2014: Edwin Aviles; 2016 – 2017: Miss Nicaragua Organization
Panama	2010s / No pageant / / / N / Y / Y / Y / Y / Y; 2020s / 20 / Y / Y / Y / Y / Y	Current: Chass Panama (2022 – Present) Former licensees: 2014 – 2018: Reinas y Mister de Panamá; 2019 – 2021: Señorita Panamá Org.
Puerto Rico	2010s / No pageant / / / 20 / 20 / 10; 2020s / 10 / 10 / 20 / Y / Y	Current: Nuestra Belleza Puerto Rico Inc. (2016 – Present) Former licensees: 2013 – 2015: Miss World Puerto Rico Organization
Saint Vincent and the Grenadines	2010s / No pageant / / / N / Y / N / N / N / N / N; 2020s / N / N / N / N / N / N	Current: – Former licensees: 2014: Miss St. Vincent and the Grenadines Organization
Trinidad and Tobago	2010s / No pageant / / / N / N / R / N / R / N / N; 2020s / N / N / N / Y / Y / Y	Current: Stolen Productions Ltd. (2023 – Present) Former licensees: 2015: Loraine Lalloon; 2017: Miss Trinidad and Tobago Organization
United States	2010s / No pageant / / 20 / Y / 20 / Y / Y / Y; 2020s / Y / Y / / Y / 20	Current: Protagonist Live LLC. (Rachel Slawson) (2024 – Present) Former licensees: 2013 – 2015: Miss Earth United States Organization; 2016 – 2017: Chantel Martinez; 2018 – 2023: Hernan Rivera
United States Virgin Islands	2010s / No pageant / / / N / Y / Y / N / Y / Y / N; 2020s / N / N / N / Y / 20 / Y	Current:Brian Javier (2023 – Present) Former licensees: 2014 – 2015, 2018: Miss US Virgin Islands Organization; 2017: Brianna Marie Key

=== Oceania ===
Color key:
Declared as the winner	10 Top 10 finalists	C Withdrew during the competition
First runner-up	20 Top 20 finalists	R Representative determined but did not compete
Second runner-up	Y Unplaced	N No representative
Third runner-up
Fourth runner-up

Miss Grand national licensees in Oceanian countries
Country/territory
Year of participation

Year	'0	'1	'2	'3	'4	'5	'6	'7	'8	'9

Licensee

Australia	2010s / No pageant / / / / / / 20 / 20 / 20 / 10; 2020s / N / 20 / Y / Y / Y / Y	Current: Rise Academy (by Dani Fitch) (2017 – 2022, 2024 – present) Former licensees: 2013 – 2014: Nadasha Zhang; 2015 – 2016: Renera Thompson; 2023: Amber Sidney
Cook Islands	2010s / No pageant / / / N / N / N / N / N / Y / N; 2020s / N / N / N / N / N / N	Current: – Former licensees: 2018: Miss Cook Islands Association
Fiji	2010s / No pageant / / / N / N / N / N / Y / R / N; 2020s / N / N / N / N / N / N	Current: – Former licensees: 2017 – 2018: Nadine Roberts
Guam	2010s / No pageant / / / N / Y / N / N / N / N / N; 2020s / N / N / N / N / N / N	Current: – Former licensees: 2014: Joyce Bamba
New Zealand	2010s / No pageant / / / Y / Y / C / Y / Y / 20 / R; 2020s / N / N / N / N / Y / Y	Current:– Former licensee: 2013 – 2019: Miss World New Zealand Organization
Samoa	2010s / No pageant / / / N / Y / N / N / N / N / N; 2020s / N / N / N / N / N / N	Current: – Former licensees: 2014: Miss Samoa Organization
Tahiti	2010s / No pageant / / / N / Y / N / 20 / N / N / N; 2020s / N / N / N / N / N / N	Current: – Former licensees: 2014: Kohotu Ariitai; 2016: Miss Tahiti Organization
Tonga	2010s / No pageant / / / N / N / Y / N / N / N / N; 2020s / N / N / N / N / N / N	Current: – Former licensees: 2015: Sicilia Makisi

=== South America ===
Color key:
Declared as the winner	10 Top 10 finalists	C Withdrew during the competition
First runner-up	20 Top 20 finalists	R Representative determined but did not compete
Second runner-up	Y Unplaced	N No representative
Third runner-up
Fourth runner-up

Miss Grand national licensees in South American countries
Country/territory
Year of participation

Year	'0	'1	'2	'3	'4	'5	'6	'7	'8	'9

Licensee

Argentina	2010s / No pageant / / / Y / Y / R / N / Y / Y / R; 2020s / 10 / Y / Y / Y / Y / Y	Current: Sambrizzi Producción (2023 – present) Former licensees: 2013 – 2014: N Entertainment; 2015: Sol Chaves Aguilar; 2017 – 2020: Marcelo Shaya; 2021 – 2022: Iron Tree SRL
Bolivia	2010s / No pageant / / / Y / Y / Y / Y / Y / Y / Y; 2020s / Y / Y / Y / Y / Y / Y	Current: Promociones Gloria (2013 – present) Former licensee No former licensee
Brazil	2010s / No pageant / 10 / 20 / 10 / Y / 20 / 20; 2020s / / Y / / 20	Current: Hazzy Top Talent (2024 – Present) Former licensees: 2013, 2015 – 2023: Henrique Fontes; 2014: Gerson Antonelli
Chile	2010s / No pageant / / / N / Y / N / N / Y / Y / 20; 2020s / Y / Y / Y / Y / Y / N	Current: Cristian Chanaca (2021–present) Former licensees: 2014: Karla Bovet Quidel; 2017 – 2018: Latin Scouting / CBC Producciones; 2019 – 2020: Keno Manzur
Colombia	2010s / No pageant / / / 20 / / Y / Y / Y / Y / 20; 2020s / Y / 20 / 10 / / 20 / 10	Current: Belleza Colombia International S.A.S. (2024 – Present) Former licensees: 2013 – 2017: Miss Earth Colombia Organization; 2018, 2021: Top 3 Latam Group/Miss Colombia; 2019: Miss Colombia/Luis Humberto Garcés; 2020: JuanJo Mendoza; 2022 – 2023: Casa de Reinas Cesar Prado
Ecuador	2010s / No pageant / / 20 / Y / R / Y / Y / Y / 10; 2020s / Y / Y / Y / Y / 20	Current: CNB Ecuador Org. (2019 – present) Former licensees: 2013 – 2018: Miss Ecuador Organization
Guyana	2010s / No pageant / / / N / N / Y / N / N / N / N; 2020s / N / N / N / N / N / Y	Current: – Former licensees: 2015: Clive Prowell
Paraguay	2010s / No pageant / / / Y / Y / N / Y / 20 / 20; 2020s / Y / Y / 20 / Y / 20 / 20	Current: MGM Producciones (2016 – Present) Former licensees: 2013 – 2014: Miss Paraguay Organization
Peru	2010s / No pageant / / / N / 20 / Y / 10 / 20 / 10; 2020s / 20 / Y / 20 / / 10 / Y	Current: Grupo D'Elite Srl (2014 – present) Former licensees: No former licensee
Suriname	2010s / No pageant / / / N / Y / Y / Y / N / Y / N; 2020s / N / N / N / N / N / N	Current: – Former licensees: 2014 – 2016: Tropical Beauties Suriname Organization; 2018 – 2019: Stefan Hoven Lieuw Choy
Uruguay	2010s / No pageant / / / N / N / N / Y / N / N / N; 2020s / Y / N / N / N / N / N	Current: – Former licensees: 2016: Miss Uruguay Organization; 2020: Certamen Nacional de Belleza Uruguay (By Yeisson Coronado Gomez)
Venezuela	2010s / No pageant / / 10 / 20 / 20 / 20 / 10; 2020s / Y / 10 / Y / Y	Current: Jacqueline Aguilera (2025 – present) Former licensees: 2013 – 2016: Bruno Caldierón; 2017 – 2018: Miguel Segovia; 2019: Osmel Sousa; 2020 – 2024: Thunder Productions CA

== See also ==
- List of beauty contests
- MGI All Stars
