= Karmarts =

Karmarts Public Company Limited

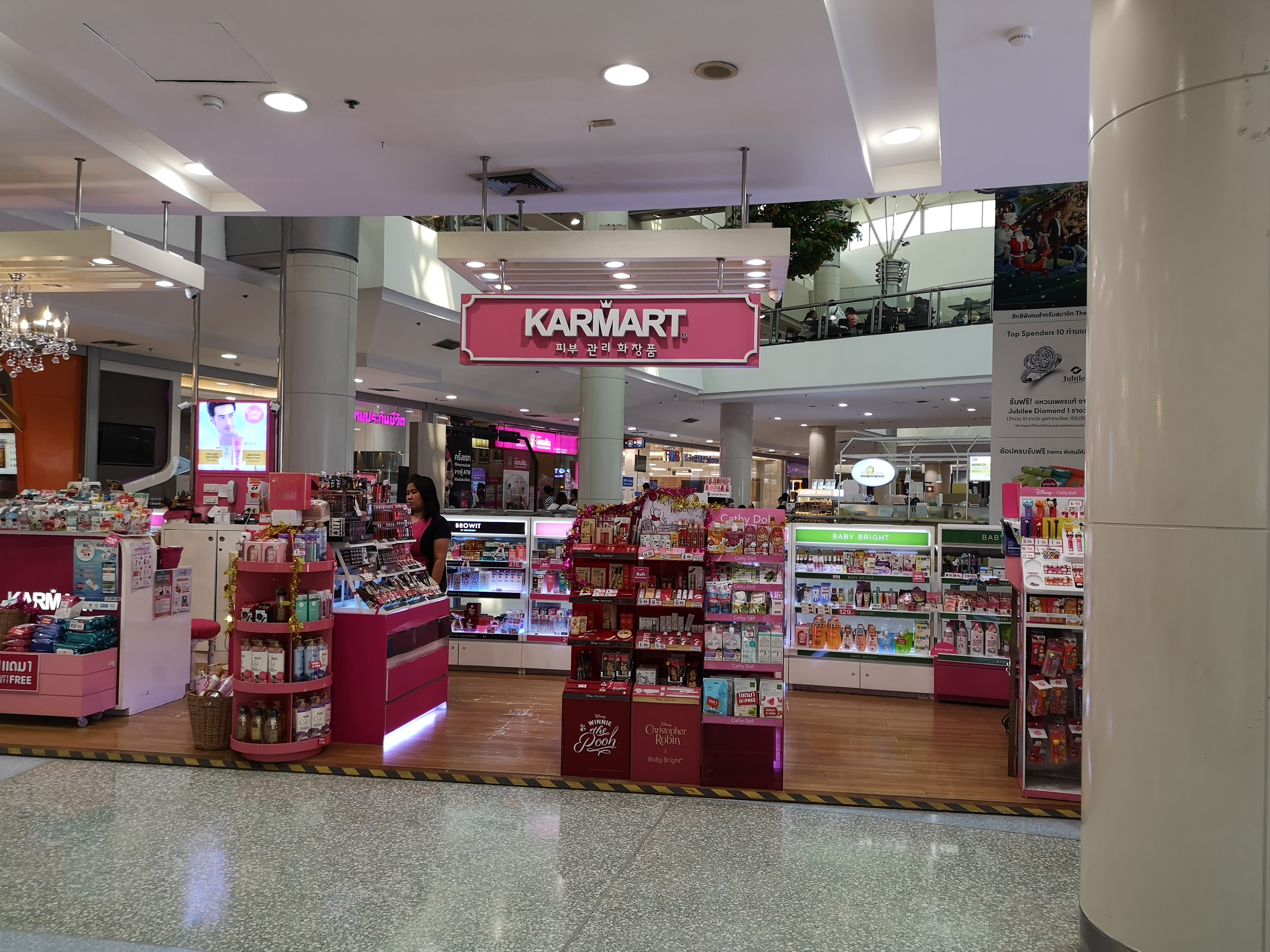
- Company type: Public
- Traded as: SET: KAMART
- ISIN: TH0467A10Z09
- Industry: Commerce
- Founded: May 11, 1982
- Headquarters: 81-81/1 Soi Phetchakasem 54 Yak 3, Bang Duan, Phasi Charoen, Bangkok, Thailand
- Number of locations: 30 shops
- Area served: Thailand
- Key people: Wiwat Theekhakhirikul (CEO)
- Products: Cosmetics
- Revenue: ▲BT฿441.99 Million (2011)
- Operating income: ▲BT฿125.96 Million (2011)
- Net income: ▲BT฿109.29 Million (2011)
- Total assets: ▲BT฿707.44 Million (2011)
- Total equity: ▲BT฿442.43 Million (2011)

Karmarts, formerly known as DiStar Electric Corporation, is an importer and distributor of multi bands cosmetic goods and beauty products. The company once was a manufacturer and distributor of electronic goods under the brand DiStar.

== History ==
The company was established as DiStar Electric Corporation on 11 May 1982 and registered as a public company on 18 March 1994. The company was listed on the Stock Exchange of Thailand on 31 October 1994.
