= Latin American diaspora in Asia =

Asian people of Latin American descent

Latin American diaspora in Asia La diáspora latinoamericana en Asia
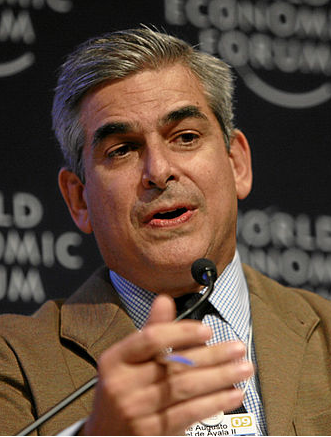
Jaime Augusto Zobel de Ayala

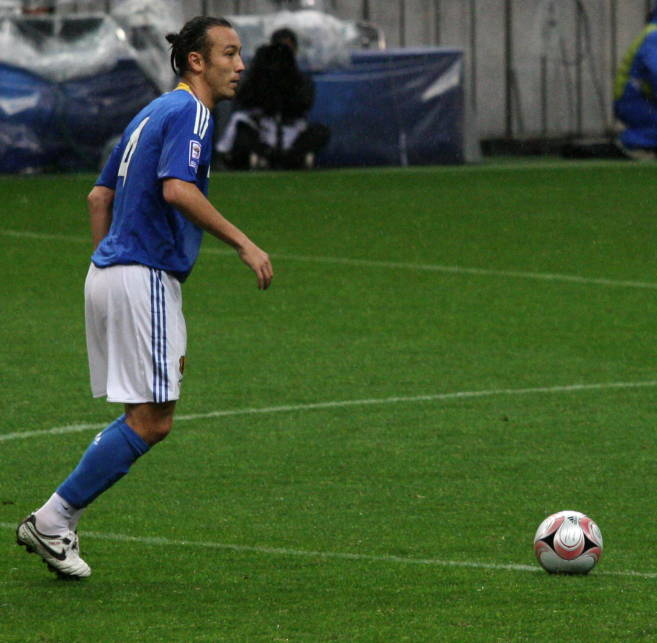
Marcus Tulio Tanaka

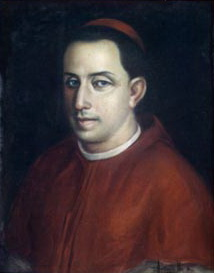
Manuel Rojo del Río y Vieyra

Total population
- Unknown, various estimates (Note: No concrete figures as to the number of Latin American Asians exist. Rough estimates place it at around 18 million Filipinos possessing significant partial or majority Hispanic/Latin American ancestry based on Spanish era censuses A 2019 inter-university anthropology study classifies 12.7% and 7.2% of the representative sample of Filipinos as "Hispanic" and "Native American". Thus, about 20% of the population or 20 Million Filipinos are Latin American by phenotype. Plus, some 250,032 Brazilians living in Japan. Thus, totaling to about 18 million 250 thousand to 20 Million 250 thousand Latin American Asians. (Based on old Spanish-Censuses of the Philippines, an inter-university anthropology study and the modern count of Brazilians in Japan))

Regions with significant populations
- Philippines and Japan

Languages
- American English, Spanish, Portuguese, Japanese and Filipino

Religion
- Christianity predominantly Roman Catholicism

The Latin American diaspora in Asia is made of Asian people of full or partial Latin American descent.

Latin American Asians have been present in Asia since the 16th century. The timeline of Latin American settlement in Asia mostly occurred from the 1500s to the 19th century when the Spanish used Filipino sailors to bring Latin Americans from across the Pacific to serve as mercenaries and traders either to supplement its Filipino soldiers in the numerous wars the Philippines had with its Muslim or Confucian neighbors which surrounded the Philippines (ensuring a state of constant warfare) or coordinate the Manila Galleon trade between Latin America and Asia. Therein, gems taken from South Asia, spices taken from Southeast Asia and silk and porcelain taken from East Asia were gathered and transshipped from the Philippines across the Pacific Ocean to Latin America in exchange for the products of Mexico in North America (Mainly chocolate and pineapples) and silver taken from the mines of Peru at South America. This trade eventually extended to Europe where the silver mined in Latin America and silk gathered in the Philippines was used by Spain to fund its wars across Europe (mainly against the Ottoman Empire) and to a lesser extent, support the Philippines' many wars against the Sultanate of Brunei and the many sultanates in Mindanao. In a small scale, a few Latin Americans also settled in the ports of Macau in China and Ternate in Indonesia which were secondary trade-nodes to the primary one between Manila and Acapulco. Asides from this historical Latin American settlement into the Philippines, which has now mostly stopped and doesn't operate anymore and the current people merely being Latin American descendants rather than Latin Americans themselves, there is also the modern presence of Brazilians in Japan which form the largest presence of people from the Americas, living in Asia, barring the Philippines.

== History ==
The first Latin Americans Asians were primarily Mexicans and to a lesser extent, Colombians and Peruvians who made their way to Asia (Mainly the Philippines) in the 16th century, either as mercenaries or traders during the Spanish colonial period of the Philippines. For two and a half centuries (between 1565 and 1815) many Mexicans and some Colombians and Peruvians were supplementing Filipino soldiers in the wars fought in conflict-ridden Philippines (I.E during the Castille War and The Battle of Manila etc.). Others were traders engaged in the Philippine-built Manila-Acapulco Galleon Route and were assisting in the Spanish Empire's monopoly in trade as well as serving as officials for the Viceregal capital of Mexico wherein the Captaincy General of the Philippines was a part of. The Latin-American soldiers who were sent to the Philippines from the Spanish colonies in America were often made up of mestizos and Indios (Amerindians). This is proven by the letters written by Governor-Generals such as Don Sebastián Hurtado de Corcuera who wrote that they brought soldiers over from Peru, settled Zamboanga City and waged war against the Sultanate of Maguindanao.

In the 20th to 21st century, hundreds of thousands of Brazilians and Japanese Brazilians either immigrated to Japan or returned to Japan after Japan became wealthy.

== Geographic distribution ==
Most of the people born in Latin America who settled in Asia or descendants of the Latin Americans who live in Asia are located in the Philippines. They are mostly concentrated in the old Spanish settlements of the Philippines. I.E Vigan, founded by the Mexico-born Conquistador, Juan de Salcedo or Puerto Princesa at Palawan, a military fortress originally created to engage in wars against the Brunei Sultanate. A city which was co-founded by a future Bishop of Colombia at South America, Saint Ezekiel Moreno, Cavite City or Zamboanga City in Mindanao, home to a Spanish-based creole language called Chavacano, a language with much linguistic borrowings from Quechua which comes from Peru, Nahuatl which has Mexican roots and Taino which is Caribbean in origin. In the 17th century, St Rose of Lima, from the Viceroyalty of Peru was declared a patron-saint of the Philippines, no doubt due to the influx of Peruvian soldiers to help in the wars against the southern Sultanates. Furthermore, in the midst of the Manila Galleon trade, a small number of Latinos settled in the ports of Macau in China and Ternate in Indonesia which were secondary connecting trade nodes to the primary trade-route between Manila, Philippines and Acapulco, Mexico.

Asides from the Philippines the only other country in Asia with a major concentration of immigrants from the Americas is Japan, where there are 250,000 Japanese of Brazilian origin. Because of common language and cultural proximity, a number of Brazilians settled Macau, others in East Timor and Goa.

== Significant communities ==
=== Philippines ===
The Latinos and the Latino-descendants in the Philippines, unlike the Latinos in the United States or Canada (who are mostly refugee-immigrants fleeing their homelands for better opportunities in richer countries) are mostly soldiers or adventurers who left a more peaceful New World to help Native Filipinos in wars within conflict-prone Philippines against the Islamic Bruneian Empire and the Moros to the South, Cambodia and Vietnam to the west and against the occasional raids by Chinese and Japanese pirates.

In the High-Medieval Period and the Age of Exploration the Spaniards often imported Mexican as well as Colombian and Peruvian mercenaries to help Filipino soldiers (Who did most of the fighting though) in these internal as well as external wars. For example, the Archbishop of Manila during the British occupation of Manila was Mexican-born.

Around the 1600s, Stephanie Mawson in her book entitled ‘Between Loyalty and Disobedience: The Limits of Spanish Domination in the Seventeenth Century Pacific’ showed that there were thousands of Latin-American settlers sent to the Philippines by the Spaniards per year and around that time-frame had cummultatively sent 15,600 settlers from Peru and Mexico while there were only 600 Spaniards from Spain, that served in a Philippine population of only 667,612 people. Due to the initial low population count, Latin American descent quickly spread across the territory.

Geographic distribution and year of settlement of the Latin-American immigrant soldiers assigned to the Philippines in the 1600s.
Location	1603	1636	1642	1644	1654	1655	1670	1672
Manila	900	446	—	407	821	799	708	667
Fort Santiago	—	22	—	—	50	—	86	81
Cavite	—	70	—	—	89	—	225	211
Cagayan	46	80	—	—	—	—	155	155
Calamianes	—	—	—	—	—	—	73	73
Caraga	—	45	—	—	—	—	81	81
Cebu	86	50	—	—	—	—	135	135
Formosa	—	180	—	—	—	—	—	—
Moluccas	80	480	507	—	389	—	—	—
Otón	66	50	—	—	—	—	169	169
Zamboanga	—	210	—	—	184	—	—	—
Other	255	—	—	—	—	—	—	—
	—	—	—	—	—	—	—	—
Total Reinforcements	1,533	1,633	2,067	2,085	n/a	n/a	1,632	1,572

Furthermore, the Spanish book: "Forzados y reclutas: los criollos novohispanos en Asia (1756-1808)" by María Fernanda García de los Arcos tallied the further immigration of 35,000 more Mexican soldiers alone (civilians not included), in the 1700s. The 35,000 Mexicans were embedded in a Philippine population of 1.5 Million, thus forming 2.33% of the population. Thus increasing the number of Latin Americans in the Philippines. As a result, German Ethnographer Fedor Jagor using Spanish censuses, estimated that one-third of the island of Luzon, which holds half of the Philippine population, had varying degrees of Spanish and Latin American ancestry. Corroborating these Spanish era estimates, an anthropological study published in the Journal of Human Biology and researched by Matthew Go, using physical anthropology, concluded that 12.7% of Filipinos can be classified as mestizo (Latin American mestizos or Malay Spanish mestizos), 7.3% as Indigenous American, and European at 2.7%. Thus, as much as 20% of those sampled bodies, which were representative of the Philippines, translating to about 20 million Filipinos, can be physically classified as mestizo in appearance. However, this is only according to an interpretation of the data wherein the reference groups, which were cross checked to the Filipino samples; for the Hispanic category, were Mexican-Americans, and the reference groups for the: European, African, and Indigenous American, categories, were: White Americans, Black Americans, and Native Americans from the USA, while the Asian reference groups were sourced from Chinese, Japanese, and Vietnamese origins. In contrast, a different anthropology study using Morphoscopic ancestry estimates in Filipino crania using multivariate probit regression models by J. T. Hefner, while analyzing Historic and Modern samples of Philippine skeletons, paint a different picture, in that, when the reference group for "Asian" was Thailand (Southeast Asians) rather than Chinese, Japanese, and Vietnamese; and the reference group for "Hispanic" was Colombians (South Americans) rather than Mexicans, the historical and modern sample results for Filipinos, yielded the following ratios: Asian at 48.6%, African at 32.9%, and only a small portion classifying as either European at 12.9%, and finally for Hispanic at 5.7%.

The military history of the Filipino archipelago resulting in the development of experienced soldiers. Isidoro Montes de Oca, a soldier of Filipino descent, earned the respect of Vicente Guerrero, a leader in the Mexican War of Independence. Even Vicente Guerrero's personal guards were mostly Filipinos or those Latinos who had seen action in the Philippines.

=== Japan ===
Japanese Brazilian immigrants to Japan numbered 250,000 in 2004, constituting Japan's second-largest immigrant population. Their experiences bear similarities to those of Japanese Peruvian immigrants, who are often relegated to low income jobs typically occupied by foreigners. Brazilian and Peruvian settlers in Japan are largely, but not exclusively of Japanese blood. Brazilian settlers to Japan represented the largest number of Portuguese speakers in Asia, greater than those of formerly Portuguese East Timor, Macau and Goa combined.

== Notable persons ==
Philippines

- Isabel Larrañaga Ramírez, Foundress of an ecclesiastical order, Peruvian Filipino.
- Manuel Rojo del Río y Vieyra, Archbishop of Manila, Mexican Filipino.
- Pedro de Agurto, Bishop of Cebu, Mexican Filipino.
- Juan de Salcedo, Conquistador, Mexican Filipino.
- Jaime Augusto Zobel de Ayala, Entrepreneur, Basque-Filipino of Mexican, Peruvian and Colombian descent
- Vicente Catalan, Admiral of the Philippine Navy, Cuban Filipino.
- Lieutenant Gabriel Badelly Méndez, Soldier in the Philippine Army, Cuban Filipino.
- Juan Fermin de San Martin, Crusader in the Spanish-Moro Conflict, Argentine Filipino.
- Mutineers in the Andrés Novales Uprising: Mexican, Colombian, Venezuelan, Peruvian, Chilean, Argentinian and Costa Rican; Filipinos.
- Stella Araneta, First Miss International, Colombian Filipino.
- Carlos Celdran, Artist, Tour Guide, Segment TV Host and Cultural Activist, Basque-Filipino of El Salvadoran, Guatemalan, Venezuelan and Mexican descent
- Chanty, singer and actress, Argentine Filipina
- Nikki de Moura, Miss Grand Philippines 2023, A Filipina-Brazilian Beauty Queen

Japan

- Yuu Kamiya, novelist
- Marcos Sugiyama, volleyball player
- Marcus Tulio Tanaka, football player
- Kaisei Ichirō, sumo wrestler
- Lisa, singer-songwriter, Japanese Colombian

== See also ==
- Latino diaspora
- Luso-Asians
