= Lyceum of Subic Bay =

Private college in Zambales, Philippines

- Liceo ng Look Subic (Filipino)
- Former names: National College of Science and Technology (2003–2005)
- Type: Private Non-sectarian Research Coeducational Basic and Higher education institution
- Established: June 2003
- President: Alfonso E. Borda
- Location: Lot 73 Rizal Hwy., Freeport Zone, Zambales, Philippines; 14°49′24″N 120°16′45″E
- Campus: Urban
- Nickname: LSB Sharks
- Website: www.lsb.edu.ph
- Location in Luzon Location in the Philippines

The Lyceum of Subic Bay, Inc. (LSB) is a non-stock, non-profit college in the Philippines, was established in the Subic Bay Freeport Zone in June 2003.

== History ==
During the first year of its operation, the institution was registered in the Securities and Exchange Commission (SEC) as National College of Science and Technology, Inc. (NCST) with Alfonso E. Borda as its first president and chief executive officer. In April 2005 the board of trustees approved the change of the name to Lyceum of Subic Bay to provide a broadened course offering.

The college is approved to offer the first two years towards a bachelor in elementary education (BEEd) with a major in early childhood, and the first two years towards the bachelor in secondary education (BSEd) major in English. It also offers other programs at the undergraduate and certificate level.

The school has a number of sports teams active in Philippines college leagues, as a member of the National Athletic Association of Schools, Colleges and Universities (NAASCU) and of Philippine Collegiate Champions League (PCCL):

- basketball
- volleyball (the women's team won the 2009-1010 NAASCU championship)

Though Lyceum of Subic Bay includes the word lyceum in its name, is not affiliated with Lyceum of the Philippines University which has campuses in Manila, Makati, Batangas, Laguna and Cavite.

== Academics ==
=== CHED programs ===
==== Architecture ====
- B.S. in Architecture

==== Business ====
- B.S. in Accountancy (BSA)
- B.S. in Business Administration

Major in Financial Management (BSBA-FM) Major in Human Resource Development Management (BSBA-HRDM)

==== Engineering ====
- B.S. in Computer Engineering (BSCOE)
- B.S. in Electrical Engineering
- B.S. in Electronics Engineering (BSECE)
- B.S. in Industrial Engineering (BSIE)

==== Tourism, Hospitality & Culinary ====
- B.S. in Hotel and Restaurant Management (BSHRM)
- B.S. in Travel Management (BSTRM)

==== IT, Computer Science & Programming ====
- B.S. in Information Technology (BSIT)
- B.S. in Computer Science major in Digital Arts and Animation

==== Social science ====
- B.S. in Criminology (BSCRIM)
- B.S. in Psychology (BSPSY)

==== Administration ====
- B.S. in Customs Administration (BSCA)

=== TECH-VOC ===
- Associate in Computer Technology (ACT)

=== TESDA programs ===
- Tourism, Hotel, and Restaurant Operation (THRO)

Bundled programs:

- House Keeping NC II
- Food and Beverage NC II
- Bartending NC II
- Front Office NC II
- Health Care Services (Practical Nursing)
- Caregiver NC II (6 months)

== Notable alumni ==
- Christine Opiaza - Beauty pageant contestant and Miss Grand Philippines 2024 titleholder.
