= Herlene Budol =

Filipino actress and comedian (born 1999)

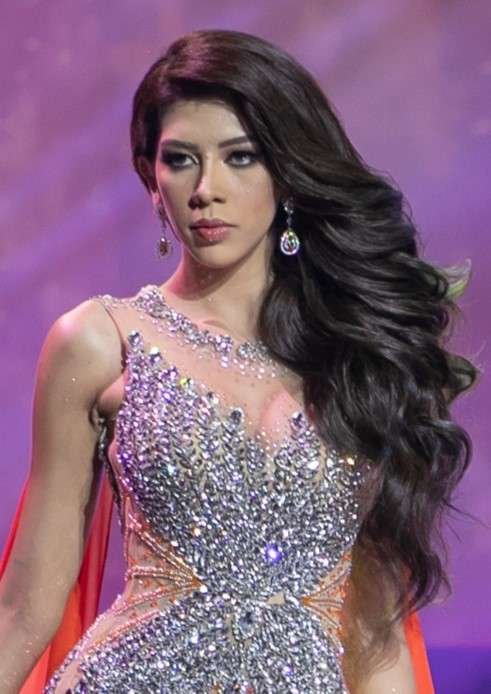
- Budol in 2022
- Born: Herlene Nicole Policarpio Budol; August 23, 1999 (age 27); Angono, Rizal, Philippines
- Education: College of Saint John Paul II Arts and Sciences (BS)
- Occupations: Comedienne; host; actress
- Known for: "Hipon", "Magandang Dilag"
- Television: GMA Network
- Height: 1.75 m (5 ft 9 in)
- Beauty pageant titleholder
- Title: Miss Planet Philippines 2022; Miss Philippines Tourism 2023
- Major competitions: Binibining Pilipinas 2022; (1st Runner-up); Miss Planet International 2022; (Withdrew); Miss Grand Philippines 2023; (Miss Philippines Tourism 2023)

Herlene Nicole Policarpio Budol (Tagalog: [pɔlɪˈkaɾpjo ˈbʊdɔl]; born August 23, 1999), also known as "Hipon Girl" (lit. ''shrimp girl'') or "Magandang Dilag" (lit. 'beautiful splendor'), or "Binibining Marikit" (lit. 'beautiful lady'), is a Filipino model, comedian, actress, and beauty pageant titleholder. She was a co-host of the Philippine variety game show Wowowin. Budol gained popularity when she joined the Wowowin segment "Willie of Fortune". Willie Revillame made her a regular co-host of his show because of her talent and funny jokes.

== Career ==
=== Acting career ===
Budol appeared in Magpakailanman on November 30, 2019, and played the role of Jenny, an OFW, in the episode "Yaya Dubai & I". That was her first television drama project in GMA Network which trended and gained higher ratings than an episode of ABS-CBN's MMK, their rival network. She also appeared in the TV series Madrasta, playing the role of 'Sandy Escudero'. She was the title holder of "Binibining Angono in Sining" in 2017. She also appeared and participated in the Philippine comedy TV series One of the Baes.

In both 2023, she played her first lead role in the GMA Afternoon Prime series, Magandang Dilag, as Georgina "Gigi" Robles / Gretchen "Greta V" Veneracion, a lady with an ugly appearance who turned into a beauty who seeks her vengeance against the person who cruelly hurts her and her loved ones. After completing the series Magandang Dilag, she also joined the cast members of the action-drama series Black Rider who played the role Marikit "Pretty" Calaguas.

=== Pageantry ===
In February 2022, Budol signed a management contract with Wilbert Tolentino. In July 2023, Tolentino terminated his management contract with Budol for health reasons and devote ample time to his child and family.

She participated in Binibining Pilipinas 2022, securing seven special awards and finishing as 1st runner-up. Although chosen as the Philippines' representative for Miss Planet International 2022, she later withdrew. Subsequently, she entered Miss Grand Philippines 2023, winning the title of Miss Philippines Tourism 2023. She is set to represent the Philippines in an upcoming international pageant, as announced by ALV Pageant Circle.

Budol is commonly referred to as The Beauty Queen of Gen Z.

== Education ==
In 2022, Budol earned her Bachelor of Science degree in Tourism Management from the College of Saint John Paul II Arts and Sciences, based in Cainta, Rizal.

== Filmography ==
=== Television ===
Year	Title	Role	Ref.
2019–2022	Wowowin	Herself/Co-Host	
2019	Magpakailanman: Yaya Dubai and I	Jenny	
2019	Madrasta	Sandy Escudero	
2019	One of the Baes	Hipon Girl	
2020	Daddy's Gurl	Josefina/Fiona	
2020	Dear Uge: Jolly Molly	Bianca Villaprado	
2021	Stories from the Heart: Never Say Goodbye	Alana Santos	
2021	Dear Uge: Asimtopangit	Chakra	
2021	Magpakailanman: A Girl Named Hipon	Herself	
2021–23	Sarap, 'Di Ba?	Herself/Guest	
2021–23	Family Feud	Herself/Guest Player	
2022	False Positive	Maganda	
2022	Tadhana: The Wedding	Jessica	
2022	Regal Studio Presents: Gayuma Girl	Maria Rosa	
2022	Happy Together	Beauty	
2022	Magpakailanman: Fiancee or Financier	Rosemarie	
2022	Wanted sa Radyo	Herself/Guest	
2023	Magandang Dilag	Georgina "Gigi" De Jesus- Robles/Gretchen "Greta V" Veneracion	
2023	Regal Studio Presents: Dugo Dugo Girl	Junnimae	
2023	Fast Talk with Boy Abunda	Herself/Guest	
2023	Daig Kayo ng Lola Ko: Joy to the World	Princess Joy Fuego	
2023–2024	Black Rider	Marikit "Pretty" Calaguas	
2023	Bubble Gang	Herself/Guest/Various	
2024	Walang Matigas na Pulis sa Matinik na Misis	Mia	
2024–present	TiktoClock	Herself/Co-host	
2024	Abot-Kamay na Pangarap	Marikit "Pretty" Calaguas	
2024	Running Man Philippines (Season 2)	Herself/Guest Runner	
2024	Tadhana: Sino si Alice	Alice	
2025	Binibining Marikit	Marikit "Ikit" Caringal	
2025	It's Showtime	Herself/Guest	

=== Web series ===
Year	Title	Role	Ref.
2022	Ang Babae sa Likod ng Face Mask	Malta	

Awards and achievements
Preceded by Justine Beatrice Felizarta (Marikina)	Miss Grand Philippines (Miss Philippines Tourism 2023); 2023	Succeeded by Patricia Bianca Tapia (Batangas)
Preceded by Krizia Vargas	Miss Planet Philippines 2022 (Resigned); 2022	Succeeded by Maria Luisa Varela
Preceded by Gabrielle Basiano (Eastern Samar)	Binibining Pilipinas (1st Runner-Up); 2022	Succeeded by Katrina Johnson (Davao del Sur)
