= Miss Grand Philippines 2024 =

Beauty pageant

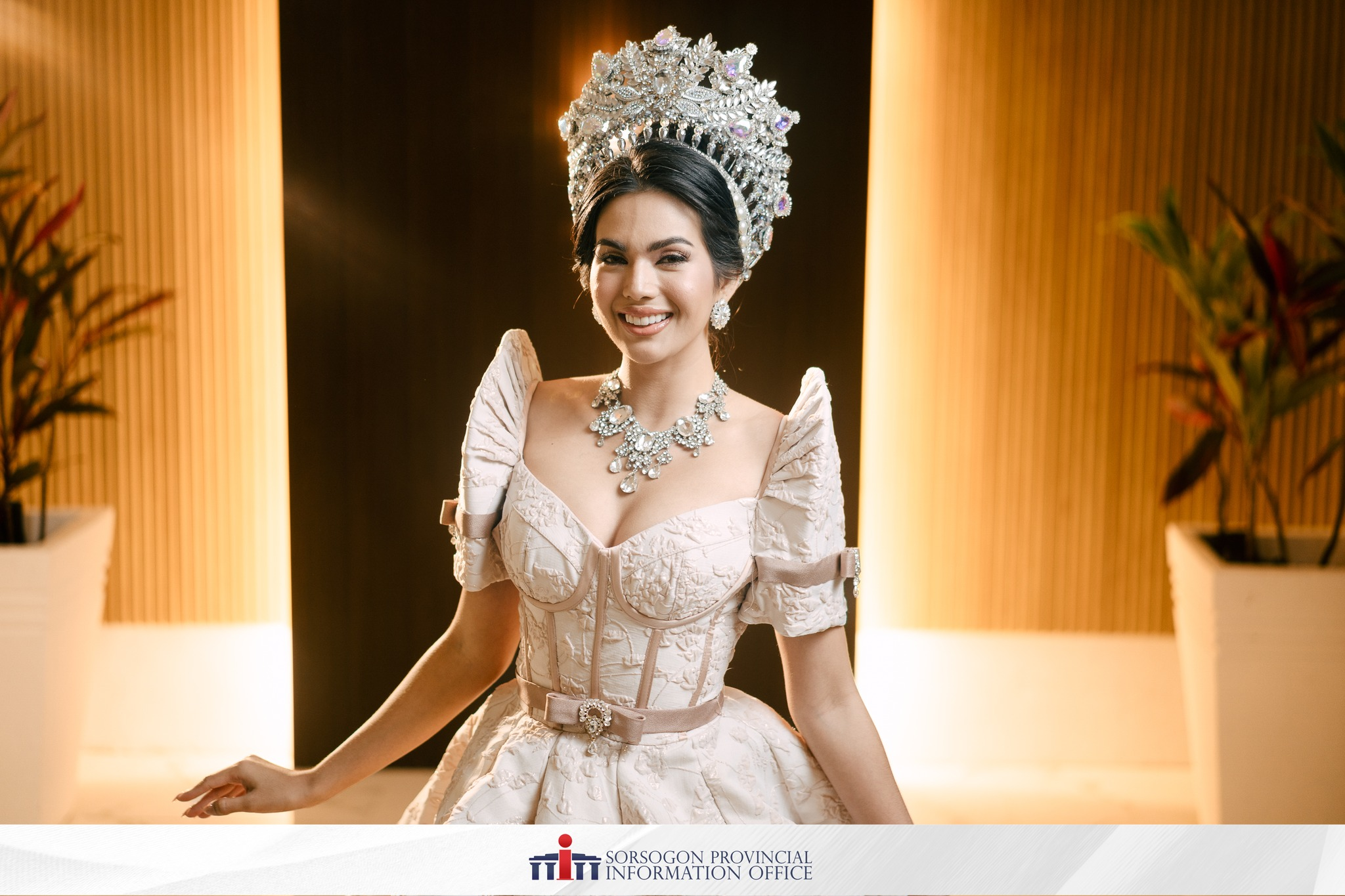
- CJ Opiaza
- Date: September 29, 2024
- Hosts: Dyan Castillejo; KC Montero; Jasmine Omay
- Entertainment: Press Hit Play
- Venue: Newport Performing Arts Theater, Pasay, Metro Manila, Philippines
- Broadcaster: ALVTV
- Entrants: 20
- Placements: 10
- Winner: CJ Opiaza; Castillejos
- Congeniality: Geralyn de Klerk, Himamaylan
- Best National Costume: Sophia Bianca Santos, Pampanga
- Photogenic: CJ Opiaza; Castillejos

External videos
- LIVE: MISS GRAND PHILIPPINES 2024 Finals Night – Part 2
- LIVE: MISS GRAND PHILIPPINES 2024 Grand Coronation Night – Part 1

Miss Grand Philippines 2024 was the third Miss Grand Philippines pageant, held at the Newport Performing Arts Theater in Pasay, Metro Manila, Philippines, on September 29, 2024.

Nikki de Moura crowned CJ Opiaza of Castillejos, Zambales as her successor at the end of the event. She represented the Philippines at the Miss Grand International 2024 pageant, held in Bangkok, where she placed as 1st runner-up. Later on, she would be crowned as Miss Grand International 2024 following the resignation of Rachel Gupta.

In addition to the main title, the country's representatives for Universal Woman and Miss Teen International were elected at the event.

== History ==
An application for the 2024 Miss Grand Philippines was officially opened in July 2024. The qualified finalists were then revealed at the press conference organized in Makati on September 23, 2024, at the Fashion Interiors by Paul Cornelissen.

Arnold Vegafria, head of the organizer ALV Pageant Circle, stated in early September 2024 that the grand final of the pageant was set for September 29, 2024, at the Newport Performing Arts Theater in Pasay City.

== Results ==
=== Placements ===
Placement	Contestant	International placement
Miss Grand Philippines 2024	Castillejos – CJ Opiaza	Winner – Miss Grand International 2024
Universal Woman Philippines 2025	Pampanga – Sophia Bianca Santos	Ineligible to compete due to age restrictions
Miss Teen Philippines 2024	Quirino – Anna Margaret Mercado §	Top 16 – Miss Teen International 2025
1st Runner-Up	Manila – Jubilee Therese Acosta	
2nd Runner-Up	Laguna – Alexandra Mae Rosales	
Top 10	Cavite – Julianne Rose Reyes; Himamaylan – Geralyn de Klerk; Pangasinan – Jenesse Viktoria Mejia; Pasig – Selena Antonio-Reyes; Zambales – Patricia McGee	

§ – Voted into the Top 10 by viewers

=== Special awards ===
Award	Contestant
Best National Costume	Pampanga – Sophia Bianca Santos
Best in Evening Gown	Pampanga – Sophia Bianca Santos
Best in Swimsuit	Castillejos – CJ Opiaza
Miss Photogenic	Castillejos – CJ Opiaza
Miss Multimedia	Castillejos – CJ Opiaza
Miss Aqua Boracay	Castillejos – CJ Opiaza
Miss Mestiza	Castillejos – CJ Opiaza
Miss Congeniality	Himamaylan – Geralyn de Klerk
Miss Popular Vote	Quirino – Anna Margaret Mercado
Miss Illo’s	Pasig – Selena Antonio-Reyes
LMT Packaging Corporation Ambassadress	Laguna – Alexandra Mae Rosales
The Palace Ambassadress	Zambales – Patricia McGee

== Contestants ==
Twenty contestants competed for the three titles.

Locality	Contestant
Batangas	Zsarlene Mae Anicete
Bulacan	Isabel Dawson
Cabanatuan	Marinell Salvador
Camarines Norte	Angela Chloe Guatno
Castillejos	CJ Opiaza
Cavite	Julianne Rose Reyes
Himamaylan	Geralyn de Klerk
Laguna	Alexandra Mae Rosales
Malabon	Carrhyll Angeline Manicad
Manila	Jubilee Therese Acosta
Marilao	Mikaela Jane Fajardo
Nueva Ecija	Alyssa Marie Geronimo
Pampanga	Sophia Bianca Santos
Pangasinan	Jenesse Viktoria Mejia
Pasig	Selena Antonio-Reyes
Quezon City	Angel Bianca Agustin
Quirino	Anna Margaret Mercado
Rizal	Samantha Margaret Babila
Santa Mesa	Diana Mariel Valendia
Zambales	Patricia McGee
