= Miss Grand Philippines 2023 =

Beauty pageant

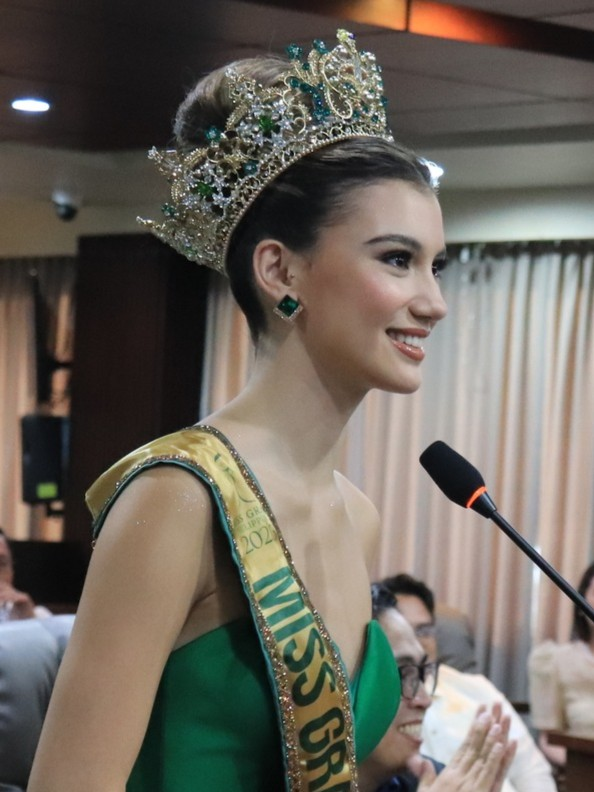
- Nikki de Moura
- Date: July 13, 2023
- Hosts: Edgar Allan Guzman; Maria Gigante; Shaila Rebortera
- Entertainment: Kris Lawrence; David Licauco
- Venue: SM Mall of Asia Arena, Pasay, Metro Manila Philippines
- Broadcaster: ALVTV, GMA Network (Replay telecast)
- Entrants: 30
- Placements: 15
- Winner: Nikki de Moura, Cagayan de Oro
- Congeniality: Laica Eupeña, General Santos
- Best National Costume: Faith Heterick, Urdaneta
- Photogenic: Nikki de Moura, Cagayan de Oro

External videos
- Grand Finals

Miss Grand Philippines 2023 was the second Miss Grand Philippines pageant, held at the SM Mall of Asia Arena in Pasay, Metro Manila, Philippines, on July 13, 2023.

At the end of the event, Binibining Pilipinas Grand International 2022 Roberta Tamondong crowned Nikki de Moura of Cagayan de Oro as Miss Grand Philippines 2023. She went on to represent the Philippines at the Miss Grand International pageant, which was held on October 25, 2023 at the Phú Thọ Indoor Stadium in Ho Chi Minh City, Vietnam.

Other titles were also given in this edition of the pageant. Michelle Arceo of Bagumbayan, Quezon City was crowned as Reina Hispanoamericana Filipinas 2023, Herlene Nicole Budol of Angono, Rizal was crowned as Miss Philippines Tourism 2023, and Francine Reyes of Tarlac was crowned as Miss Eco Teen Philippines 2023.

This edition is the first Miss Grand Philippines competition held under the ALV Pageant Circle management, after Binibining Pilipinas Charities Inc. did not renew the franchise.

== Background ==
=== Location and date ===
After the first edition in 2014, no Miss Grand Philippines competitions held independently to elect titleholders from 2015 to 2022; the representatives of the country at Miss Grand International were determined through Binibining Pilipinas, until Arnold Vegafria of ALV Pageant Circle acquired the license in 2023.

A press conference of the new organization and standalone Miss Grand Philippines competition was held on November 26, 2022, at the Hilton Manila, attended by Miss Grand International president Nawat Itsaragrisil and Miss Grand International 2022, Isabella Menin of Brazil.

==== Selection of participants ====
The national aspirants for Miss Grand Philippines 2023 were both determined through regional pageants and national auditions. An audition round held by the central organizer was divided into 2 sessions: an online application was officially opened on March 18, with a deadline of May 31, while an onsite casting was conducted twice: first on June 2, 2023, at the Teatrino Promenade of the Promenade Mall — Greenhills Shopping Center, Metro Manila, where the batch of 11 national aspirants were chosen, and the other 15 candidates were elected through a second casting organized on June 7 at the Newport World Resorts, Pasay City. The completed list of candidates, who qualified via both regional pageants, online registration, and onsite casting were later revealed on June 9.

For the regional selection, the ALV Pageant Circle signed an agreement with the local government of Pangasinan that the winner of the annual "Limgas na Pangasinan" pageant will automatically qualify to join the Miss Grand Philippines 2023 competition.

== Results ==
=== Placements ===
Placement	Contestant	International placement
Miss Grand Philippines 2023	Cagayan de Oro – Nikki de Moura	Unplaced – Miss Grand International 2023
Reina Hispanoamericana Filipinas 2023	Bagumbayan, Quezon City – Michelle Arceo	2nd Runner-Up – Reina Hispanoamericana 2023
Miss Eco Teen Philippines 2023	Tarlac – Francine Reyes	Top 11 – Miss Eco Teen International 2023
Miss Philippines Tourism 2023	Angono, Rizal – Herlene Nicole Budol	
1st Runner-Up	Caloocan – Shanon Tampon	
2nd Runner-Up	Caluya, Antique – Charie Manalo Sergio	
Top 10	Northern Samar – Maria Gail Tobes; Nueva Ecija – Aeroz Ganiban; Pampanga – Dynara Maurer; Pangasinan – Rona Lalaine Lopez	
Top 15	Occidental Mindoro – Gabrielle Basan Runnstrom; San Juan – Arine Ejercito Tan; Socorro, Quezon City – Queen Mongcupa; Sultan Kudarat – Dianne Pampura; Urdaneta – Faith Grace Heterick	

=== Special awards ===
Award	Contestant
Kapetan Cafe's Best in Runway	Angono, Rizal – Herlene Nicole Budol
Best National Costume	Urdaneta – Faith Grace Heterick
Best in Evening Gown	Caluya, Antique – Charie Manalo Sergio
Best in Swimsuit	Bagumbayan, Quezon City – Michelle Arceo
Miss Photogenic	Cagayan de Oro – Nikki de Moura
Miss Multimedia	Caloocan – Shanon Tampon
Miss Congeniality	General Santos – Laica Eupeña

=== Sponsor awards ===
Award	Candidate
Miss Ever Bilena	Angono, Rizal – Herlene Nicole Budol
Miss Hello Glow	Bagumbayan, Quezon City – Michelle Arceo
Miss Blackwater	Caloocan – Shanon Tampon
Miss Careline	Cagayan de Oro – Nikki de Moura
Miss Ever Organics	Nueva Ecija – Aeroz Ganiban
Miss Spotlight	Northern Samar – Maria Gail Tobes
Miss Hyaloo	Pangasinan – Rona Lalaine Lopez
Skin Elements Ambassadors	Cagayan de Oro – Nikki de Moura; Pampanga – Dynara Maurer; San Juan – Arine Ejercito Tan; Tarlac – Francine Reyes; Urdaneta – Faith Grace Heterick
Miss ArenaPlus	Angono, Rizal – Herlene Nicole Budol
Miss K Magic	Tarlac – Francine Reyes
Miss Mermaid Manila Hair	Angono, Rizal – Herlene Nicole Budol
Miss Bench Body	Northern Samar – Maria Gail Tobes
Miss Bench	Cagayan de Oro – Nikki de Moura
Miss Aqua Boracay	Bagumbayan, Quezon City – Michelle Arceo
Miss Stackey	Bagumbayan, Quezon City – Michelle Arceo
Miss Philippine Airlines	Cagayan de Oro – Nikki de Moura
ALV Talent Brand Star	San Juan – Arine Ejercito Tan; Tarlac – Francine Reyes; Urdaneta – Faith Grace Heterick
Miss BlueWater Day Spa	Angono, Rizal – Herlene Nicole Budol

== Pageant ==
=== Format ===
Fifteen semifinalists were chosen through the preliminary competition— composed of the swimsuit and evening gown competitions and closed-door interviews. The top 15 competed in the swimsuit competition and the evening gown competition, and were narrowed down to the top ten afterward. The top ten competed in the question and answer round, after which the winners and the runners-up were named.

=== Selection committee ===
- Joee Guilas – Newscaster, PTV 4
- John Domantay - President and CEO, Lancaster Technology and Development Corporation
- Christopher Co – Executive Director for Marketing, Aqua Boracay
- Alyssa Muhlach – Actress, Reina Hispanoamericana Filipinas 2018
- Dr. Rosanie F. Estuche – President, City University of Pasay
- Enzo Pineda – Actor
- Rafael Jasper Vicencio
- Nancy Go
- Dr. Demiee Grace Sy – Public Relations Officer, Ever Bilena Cosmetics
- Capt. Stanley Ng – President and COO, Philippine Airlines
- Bryan Lim – Executive Vice President, Bench/Suyen Corporation
- Rian Fernandez – CEO, Rian Fernandez Atelier
- Isabella Menin – Miss Grand International 2022
- Joey Abacan – Vice President for Program Management, GMA Network
- Vivienne Tan – Executive Vice President and Chief Administrative Officer, Philippine Airlines
- Elizabeth Clenci – Binibining Pilipinas Grand International 2017, Miss Grand International 2017 Second Runner-Up

== Contestants ==
Thirty contestants competed for the four titles.

No	Locality	Contestant	Age (Note: Ages at the time of the pageant)
1	Angono	Herlene Nicole Budol	23
2	Baguio	Imogene Balles	22
3	Bagumbayan	Michelle Arceo	25
4	Bohol	Marinella Catangay	25
5	Cagayan	Nikki de Moura	19
6	Caloocan	Shanon Tampon	26
7	Caluya	Charie Manalo Sergio	23
8	Cavite	Estephanie Delgado	25
9	General Santos	Laica Eupeña	21
10	Laguna	Jan Wilsie Perez	20
11	La Union	Zyra Mae Carbonell	22
12	Marikina	Bernadine Ambry Nicolas	23
13	Naga	Carla Fatima Tobias	22
14	Northern Samar	Maria Gail Tobes	28
15	Nueva Ecija	Aeroz Ganiban	21
16	Occidental Mindoro	Gabrielle Basan Runnstrom	29
17	Pampanga	Dynara Maurer	22
18	Pangasinan	Rona Lalaine Lopez	20
19	Parañaque	Leorenjen Gonzaga	24
20	Pasay	Resalina Toledo	23
21	Rizal	Camilla Ricarto	25
22	San Juan	Arine Ejercito Tan	21
23	San Leonardo	Bernadette Fajardo	24
24	Sarangani	Ejay Vergara	21
25	Socorro	Queen Mongcupa	23
26	Sultan Kudarat	Dianne Pampura	23
27	Tantangan	Jirah Bantas	22
28	Tarlac	Francine Reyes	19
29	Tuy	Catherine Camilon	26
30	Urdaneta	Faith Grace Heterick	21
