= Miss Planet International =

International beauty pageant

- Type: International women's beauty pageant
- Headquarters: Phnom Penh, Cambodia
- Most recent edition: 2025
- Current titleholder: Sydney Marith; Cambodia
- President: Halley Amin
- Vice President: Min Ha Ritah
- CEO: Pedro Francisco
- Founded: March 1, 2019; 7 years ago
- Website: missplanetinternational

Miss Planet International is an annual international beauty pageant organized by Miss Planet International Organization. MPI is an organization focused on promoting the United Nations Sustainable Development Goals. As part of this mission, it has developed a contest program aimed at selecting ambassadors from each participating country.

Miss Planet International 2025 was won by Sydney Marith from Cambodia, while the newly added title, This year marks the fifth edition of Miss Planet International. The event took place on March 15, 2026, at the Koh Pich Theater, Koh Pich, Phnom Penh, Cambodia.

== History ==
The pageant was created by Min Halimas, known as Halley Amin, President and Producer, together with Pedro Francisco, former National Director (2018) of Miss Progress International.

Founded nine years earlier, Miss Progress International had already established a format centered on the United Nations Sustainable Development Goals and on empowering young women to become role models and agents of positive social change. Under Pedro Francisco's leadership as CEO, Miss Planet International subsequently reproduced several key features previously introduced by Miss Progress International, including its overall structure, its SDG-based framework, and its emphasis on empowerment and social impact..

During 2020 and 2021, due to the global COVID-19 pandemic, Miss Planet International (MPI) did not host the pageant. It was not until 2022 that MPI announced its intention to hold the Miss Planet International pageant in Uganda. Although 68 member countries had registered by November 2022, the event could not take place as many countries withdrew for various reasons. Concerns about safety and security due to the Ebola outbreak led many candidates to withdraw just days before the event, causing causing its cancellation and minor financial losses. Consequently, the planned event in Uganda was canceled, and the MPI competition was moved back to Cambodia, where it was held in January 2023 at the Diamond Island Theater in Phnom Penh.

== Titleholder ==
Miss Planet International has been running for four years and has crowned all four winners. Meanwhile, the newly introduced title, Angel Planet International, was awarded to Olla Levina from Indonesia, marking a historic first for Miss Planet International.

Year	Edition	Miss Planet International	Runners-up						Date	Venue	Host country	Entrants	Ref.
Year	Edition	Miss Planet International	First	Second	Third	Fourth	Fifth	Sixth	Date	Venue	Host country	Entrants	Ref.
2019	1st	South Africa; Monique Best	Thailand; Marisa Phonthirat	Malaysia; Viviana Winston	Paraguay; Nicole Cano	Philippines; Krizia Nicole Apao Vargas	Russia; Guzaliya Izmailova	Not awarded	March 1, 2019	Diamond Theater, Phnom Penh	Cambodia	39	
2021	2020 Pageant was cancelled due to the host country's Ebola outbreak.												
2022	2nd	Philippines; Maria Luisa Varela	Zimbabwe; Jemima Ruth Mandemwa	Japan; Ono Aya	Vietnam; Tiffany Hà	Finland; Katariina Juselius	Latvia; Alina Safronova	Cambodia; Sreyleak Pok	January 29, 2023	Koh Pich Theater, Phnom Penh	Cambodia	14	
2023	3rd	Thailand; Worawalan Phutklang	Brazil; Loraine Lumatelli	Vietnam; Kateryn Kim Diệp	United States; Angelica Briceño	Venezuela; Marian Pérez	Japan; Yumiko Nishimori	Russia; Alina Garaeva	November 19, 2023	Koh Pich Theater, Phnom Penh	Cambodia	42	
2024	4th	United Arab Emirates; Mahra Lutfi	Luxembourg; Ghada Ben Eihaj	Thailand; Panida Kernjida	Ukraine; Viktoria Oshur	Philippines; Crysthell Ramos	United States; Kristina Burkhan	Sweden; Danielle Lundqvist	November 27, 2024	Koh Pich Theater, Phnom Penh	Cambodia	71	
2025	5th	Cambodia; Sydney Marith	Mexico; Cristina Meza	France; Amélie Gigan	Mauritius; Amanda Bransbury	Japan; Kaho Sugiyama	Not awarded	Not awarded	March 15, 2026	Koh Pich Theater, Phnom Penh	Cambodia	33	

Countries by number of wins
Country	Titles	Year(s)
Cambodia	1	2025
United Arab Emirates	1	2024
Thailand	1	2023
Philippines	1	2022
South Africa	1	2019

Continents by number of wins
Continents	Titles	Country (Number)
The Americas	0	
Europe	0	
Asia	4	PHL 1, THA 1, ARE 1, KHM 1
Africa	1	ZAF 1
Australia and Oceania	0	

=== Continental winners ===
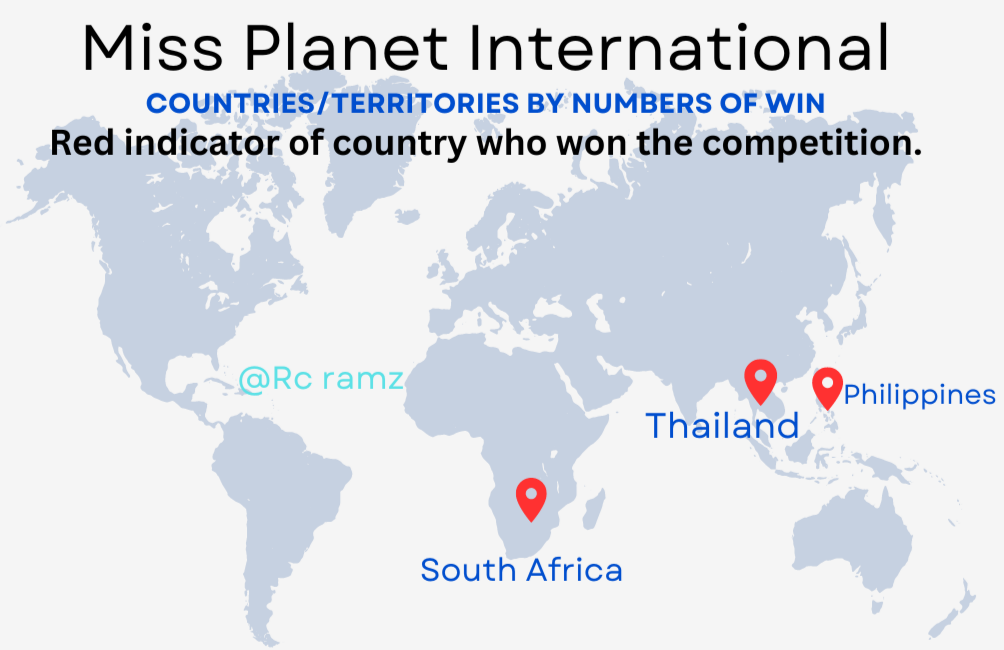
Countries that won the title at Miss Planet International in 2019–2023

Year	Miss Planet Africa	Miss Planet Americas	Miss Planet Asia	Miss Planet Europe
2024	Not awarded	Not awarded	Singapore; Jesseca Long	Not awarded
2025	Mauritius; Amanda Bransbury	Mexico; Cristina Meza	Indonesia; Wenda Yunita Tarigan	France; Amélie Gigan

Continental Queens tabulation
Country	Titles	Continental(s)	Winning Years
France	1	Europe	2025
Indonesia	1	Asia	2025
Mauritius	1	Africa	2025
Mexico	1	Americas	2025
Singapore	1	Asia	2024

== Results ==
=== Miss Planet International 2025 ===
==== Placements ====
Placement	Contestant
Miss Planet International 2025	Cambodia - Sydney Marith §
1st Runner-Up	Mexico - Cristina Meza
2nd Runner-Up	France - Amélie Gigan
3rd Runner-Up	Mauritius - Amanda Bransbury
4th Runner-Up	Japan - Kaho Sugiyama
Top 10	Algeria - Anissa Belkessam; Ireland - Selin Malin Kim; Timor-Leste - Eufrasia Vieira; United States - Sukie Cheema; United States Virgin Islands - Adisha Penn
Top 20	Cameroon - Lorelle Mballa; Côte d'Ivoire - Noura Traoré; Democratic Republic of the Congo - Raïssa D'Zentim; Haiti - Linsay Alcindor; Indonesia - Wenda Yunita Tarigan; Madagascar - Tatiana Raharinirina; Poland - Luisa Gtzow; Riviera Maya - Dayana Hernández; Russia - Sofia Beliakova; Suriname - Moana Jaymie
Continental Queens
Continent/Region	Contestant
Miss Planet Americas	Mexico - Cristina Meza
Miss Planet Asia	Indonesia - Wenda Yunita Tarigan
Miss Planet Africa	Mauritius - Amanda Bransbury
Miss Planet Europe	France - Amélie Gigan
Special awards
Award	Contestant
Miss Tourism Ambassador	United States - Sukie Cheema
Best National Costume	United States Virgin Islands - Adisha Penn
Best Interview	Cambodia - Sydney Marith
Miss Fashion Model	Mexico - Cristina Meza
Miss Social Media	Timor-Leste - Eufrasia Vieira
Miss Popular Vote	Cambodia - Sydney Marith
Miss Friendship	Haiti - Linsay Alcindor
Miss Photogenic	Russia - Sofia Beliakova
Sustainable Princess	Japan - Kaho Sugiyama
Best in Swimwear	Democratic Republic of the Congo - Raïssa D'Zentim
Best in Evening Gown	Mexico - Cristina Meza
Miss Elegant Body	Cambodia - Sydney Marith
Miss Humanity	Ireland - Selin Malin Kim
Miss Perfecto Hair	Algeria - Anissa Belkessam
Miss Planet Ambassador	Timor-Leste - Eufrasia Vieira

§ - Voted into the Top 10 by viewers.

==== Contestants ====
Country/Territory	Contestant
Algeria	Anissa Belkessam
Australia	Raluca-Sandra Moore
Bangladesh	Sultana Atoshy
Benin	Awaou Boni Tessi
Cambodia	Sydney Marith
Cameroon	Lorelle Mballa
Côte d'Ivoire	Noura Traoré
Democratic Republic of the Congo	Raïssa D'Zentim
Ethiopia	Gelila Tesfaye
France	Amélie Gigan
Guatemala	Leslie Alonzo
Haiti	Linsay Alcindor
Hmong	Hlija Lisa Lee
Iceland	Regina Lea Ólafsdóttir
India	Snehashree Gowda
Indonesia	Wenda Yunita Tarigan
Ireland	Selin Malin Kim
Italy	Christina Prado
Japan	Kaho Sugiyama
Madagascar	Tatiana Raharinirina
Mauritius	Amanda Bransbury
Mexico	Cristina Meza
New Zealand	Shoni Marsden
Panama	Adriana Ramsay
Poland	Luisa Gtzow
Riviera Maya	Dayana Hernández
Russia	Sofia Beliakova
Slovenia	Victoria Lobanova
Sweden	Ellinor Lund
Suriname	Moana Jaymie
Timor-Leste	Eufrasia Vieira
United States	Sukie Cheema
United States Virgin Islands	Adisha Penn

=== Miss Planet International 2024 ===
==== Placements ====
Placement	Contestant
Miss Planet International 2024	United Arab Emirates - Mahra Lutfi
Miss Angel Planet International 2024	Indonesia - Olla Levina
1st Runner-Up	Luxembourg - Ghada Ben Elhaj (Resigned)
2nd Runner-Up	Thailand - Panida Kernjinda
3rd Runner-Up	Ukraine - Viktoria Oshur
4th Runner-Up	Philippines - Chrystel Correos
5th Runner-Up	United States - Kristina Burkhan
6th Runner-Up	Sweden - Daniella Lundqvist
Top 11	Costa Rica - Margaret Gray; Morocco - Souhaila Jaeger; Singapore - Jesseca Long
Top 18	Brazil - Paula Assunção; Croatia - Milena Grgas; Denmark - Andrea Ziir; Grenada - Raquel Richardson; Iceland - Guðrún Sigurbjörnsdóttir; Malaysia - Qiara Loh; Serbia - Hristina Vujinović
Top 28	Cambodia - Sovansonita Khon §; France - Kenya Nicol; Kenya - Sharon Mutai; Mexico - Oksana Smith; Nepal - Anisha Parajuli; Nigeria - Alina Marlene; Poland - Angelika Michalec; Russia - Julia Getman; Venezuela - Karen Dorante; Vietnam - Quỳnh Nguyễn
Continental Queens
Continent/Region	Contestant
Miss Planet Asia	Singapore - Jesseca Long
Special awards
Award	Contestant
Best National Costume	Philippines - Chrystel Correos
Miss Friendship	Croatia - Milena Grgas
Miss Photogenic	Morocco - Souhaila Jaeger
Sustainable Princess	Iceland - Guðrún Sigurbjörnsdóttir
Best in Swimwear	United States - Kristina Burkhan
Best in Evening Gown	Thailand - Panida Kernjinda
Miss Best Interview	Brazil - Paula Assunção
Miss Elegant Body	Thailand - Panida Kernjinda
Miss Humanity	Nepal - Anisha Parajuli
Miss Tourism Ambassador	Vietnam - Quỳnh Nguyễn
Miss Top Model	Senegal - Camilla Diagne
Miss Queen of Vote	Cambodia - Sovansonita Khon
Miss Social Media	United Arab Emirates - Mahra Lutfi
Miss Perfect Hair	Ukraine - Viktoria Oshur

§ - Voted into the Top 28 by viewers.

==== Contestants ====
Country/Territory	Contestant
Australia	Bruna Cuimaraes
Belgium	Tiffany Laurens
Brazil	Paula Assunção
Bulgaria	Aysun Bekir
Cambodia	Sovansonita Khon
Cameroon	Nkwain Ashly
Canada	Eleonora Abakumova
Chile	Monica de Caro
China	Lijing Zhou
Colombia	Melissa Delgado
Costa Rica	Margaret Gray
Croatia	Milena Grgas
Democratic Republic of the Congo	Sharon Vaartjes
Denmark	Andrea Ziir
Eritrea	Eldana Siem
France	Kenya Nicol
Georgia	Natia Lomouri
Grenada	Raquel Richardson
Haiti	Tamania Gaudreault
Hong Kong	Ines Emma
Hungary	Virag Varga
Iceland	Guðrún Sigurbjörnsdóttir
India	Divya Rao
Indonesia	Olla Levina
Iran	Elma Shad
Italy	Katerine Giuberti
Japan	Nana Mori
Kazakhstan	Ainura Kalizhanova
Kenya	Sharon Mutai
Liberia	Salafana Scott
Luxembourg	Ghada Ben Elhaj
Malaysia	Qiara Loh
Mauritius	Vaibhavi Latchmoodoo
Mexico	Oksana Smith
Morocco	Souhaila Jaeger
Nepal	Anisha Parajuli
Netherlands	Petra Lind
New Zealand	Mutiara Muroso
Nigeria	Alina Marlene
Pakistan	Malyka Alvi
Paraguay	Michelle Chase
Philippines	Chrystel Correos
Poland	Angelika Michalec
Portugal	Daniella André
Russia	Julia Getman
Rwanda	Yvonne Kabarokore
Senegal	Camilla Diagne
Serbia	Hristina Vujinović
Singapore	Jesseca Long
South Africa	Zintle Nxadi
South Korea	Suah Ahn
Sweden	Daniella Lundqvist
Switzerland	Lauren Bonny
Tanzania	Rehema Nzali
Thailand	Panida Kernjinda
Ukraine	Viktoria Oshur
United Arab Emirates	Mahra Lutfi
United Kingdom	Chelsea Mandizha
United States	Kristina Burkhan
Venezuela	Karen Dorante
Vietnam	Quỳnh Nguyễn
Zimbabwe	Brenda Kadewa

=== Miss Planet International 2023 ===
==== Placements ====
Placement	Contestant
Miss Planet International 2023	Thailand - Worawalan Phutklang
1st Runner-Up	Brazil - Loraine Lumatelli
2nd Runner-Up	Vietnam - Kateryn Kim Diệp
3rd Runner-Up	United States - Angelica Briceño
4th Runner-Up	Venezuela - Marian Pérez
5th Runner-Up	Japan - Yumiko Nishimori
Top 10	Cambodia - Sopheaksindy Dam; Ecuador - Martha Álvarez; Greece - Athanasia Kofinioti; Russia - Alina Garaeva
Top 17	Bangladesh - Israt Jahan; India - Aditi Bhatnagar; Kenya - Vivian Maloba; Mexico - Cristina Guillen; Mongolia - Misheel Nasanjargal; Myanmar - Mee Mee Hlu; South Korea - Nari Kim
Top 27	Iran - Selena Xademi; Jamaica - Natacha Ashman; Laos - Soutthida Chanthalangsy; Latvia - Dorida Vlasova; Malaysia - Hazel Arthur; Nepal - Saleena Nepal; Philippines - Cheska Nicolas; Sri Lanka - Rani Sangeeta; Ukraine - Yuliia Erfe; Zambia - Domiah Lihonde
Special awards
Award	Contestant
Best National Costume	Cambodia - Sopheaksindy Dam
Miss Friendship	Kenya - Vivian Maloba
Miss Photogenic	Mongolia - Misheel Nasanjargal
Best in Swimsuit	Brazil - Loraine Lumatelli
Miss Perfect Evening Gown	Thailand - Worawalan Phuktklang
Miss Elegance	Brazil - Loraine Lumatelli
Miss Humanity	Ecuador - Martha Álvarez
Miss Tourism Ambassador	Nepal - Saleena Nepal
Miss Popularity	Myanmar - Mee Mee Hlu
Miss Social Media	Laos - Soutthida Chanthalangsy
Shine Bright Like a Diamond Award	Vietnam - Kateryn Kim Diệp

==== Contestants ====
Country/Territory	Contestant
Afghanistan	Sophia Koyama
Australia	Hayley Bradney
Bangladesh	Israt Jahan
Belarus	Anastasia Solobniko
Brazil	Loraine Lumatelli
Cambodia	Sopheaksindy Dam
Cameroon	Marie Helene
Colombia	Monica Lozano
Côte d'Ivoire	Christiane Lago
Czech Republic	Kristýna Kucirková
Democratic Republic of the Congo	Laure Gael Chafi
Ecuador	Martha Álvarez
Finland	Ellen Serr
Greece	Athanasia Kofinioti
Hong Kong	Suri Suri
India	Aditi Bhatnagar
Iran	Selena Xademi
Jamaica	Natacha Ashman
Japan	Yumiko Nishimori
Kazakhstan	Sherby Bagdatovna
Kenya	Vivian Maloba
Kyrgyzstan	Gulgaky Ergeshova
Laos	Soutthida Chanthalangsy
Latvia	Dorida Vlasova
Malaysia	Hazel Arthur
Mexico	Cristina Guillén
Mongolia	Misheel Nasanjargal
Myanmar	Mee Mee Hlu
Nepal	Saleena Nepal
Philippines	Cheska Nicolas
Russia	Alina Garaeva
Saudi Arabia	Rumy Al Qathani
South Korea	Nari Kim
Sri Lanka	Rani Sangeeta
Thailand	Worawalan Phutklang
Ukraine	Yuliia Erfe
United States	Angelica Briceño
Venezuela	Marian Pérez
Vietnam	Kateryn Kim Diệp
Zambia	Domiah Lihonde
Zimbabwe	Lindsay Nyabereke

=== Miss Planet International 2022 ===
==== Placements ====
Placement	Contestant
Miss Planet International 2022	Philippines - Maria Luisa Varela
1st Runner-Up	Zimbabwe - Jemima Mandewma
2nd Runner-Up	Japan - Ono Aya
3rd Runner-Up	Vietnam - Tiffany Hà
4th Runner-Up	Finland - Katariina Juselius
5th Runner-Up	Latvia - Alina Safronova
6th Runner-Up	Cambodia - Sreyleak Pok
Special awards
Award	Contestant
Best National Costume	Cambodia - Sreyleak Pok
Miss Friendship	Latvia - Alina Safronova
Miss Photogenic	Zimbabwe - Jemima Mandewma
Miss Perfect Evening Gown	Latvia - Alina Safronova
Miss Humanity	Pakistan - Shafaq Akhtar
Miss Tourism Ambassador	Laos - Soeng Vongchanpenhbormey
Miss Popularity	India - Rakshaya Manohar
Miss Social Media	Philippines - Maria Luisa Varela
Miss Natural Beauty	Tanzania - Eva Raphael

==== Contestants ====
Country	Contestant
Belgium	Cyrielle Guimezap
Botswana	Onameditse Botumile
Cambodia	Sreyleak Pok
China	Yick-Yu Lok
Finland	Katariina Juselius
India	Rakshaya Manohar
Japan	Ono Aya
Laos	Soeng Vongchanpenhbormey
Latvia	Alina Safronova
Pakistan	Shafaq Akhtar
Philippines	Maria Luisa Varela
Tanzania	Eva Raphael
Vietnam	Tiffany Hà
Zimbabwe	Jemima Mandemwa

=== Miss Planet International 2019 ===
==== Placements ====
Placement	Contestant
Miss Planet International 2019	South Africa - Monique Best
1st Runner-Up	Thailand - Marisa Phonthirat
2nd Runner-Up	Malaysia - Viviana Winston
3rd Runner-Up	Paraguay - Nicole Cano
4th Runner-Up	Philippines - Krizia Vargas
5th Runner-Up	Russia - Guzaliya Izmailova
Top 16	Australia - Krysta Heath; Brazil - Larissa Santana; Cambodia - Rychamnan Kallyan; Costa Rica - Marianella Cháves; India - Leena Vishwakarma; Kenya - Ivy Marani; Myanmar - Susan Shwine; Portugal - Alexandra Garcês; South Korea - Jung Yoon Choi; Vietnam - Jacqueline Đăng
Special awards
Award	Contestant
Best National Costume	Cambodia - Rychamnan Kallyan
Miss Friendship	Mexico - Janethe Ramirez
Miss Photogenic	Latvia - Alina Gayle
Miss Beautiful Body	Kenya - Ivy Marani
Best in Swuimsuit	Paraguay - Nicole Cano
Miss Perfect Evening Gown	Malaysia - Viviana Winston
Best Local Wisdom National Design	Laos - Vilaphone Khankeo
Miss Humanity	Vietnam - Jacqueline Đăng
Miss Ambassador	Portugal - Alexandra Garcês
Mejor Talent	Ukraine - Olena Havrylenko
Miss Popularity	Japan - Chisato Nagayasu
Miss Na Sa Cosmetics	Thailand - Marisa Phonthirat

==== Contestants ====
Country/Territory	Contestant
Argentina	Jesica Roses
Australia	Krysta Heath
Belarus	Karina Kiseleva
Belgium	Shirin Rotty
Brazil	Larissa Santana
Burundi	Irene Uwimana
Cambodia	Rychamnan Kallyan
Costa Rica	Marianella Cháves
Egypt	Naureen Youssef
Eswatini	Nolwazi Simelane
France	Claire Boucau
India	Leena Vishwakarma
Japan	Chisato Nagayasu
Kenya	Ivy Marani
Laos	Vilaphone Khankeo
Latvia	Alina Gayle
Malaysia	Viviana Winston
Mexico	Janeth Ramírez
Mongolia	Darima Shagdurova
Myanmar	Susan Shwine
Nepal	Ashmita Sharma
Netherlands	Shadee Acton
Paraguay	Nicole Cano
Philippines	Krizia Vargas
Portugal	Alexandra Garcês
Puerto Rico	Natalie Maldonado
Russia	Guzaliya Izmailova
Serbia	Tamara Novaković
South Africa	Monique Best
South Korea	Jung-yoon Choi
Thailand	Marisa Phonthirat
Ukraine	Olena Havrylenko
United States	Mina Skyler
Vietnam	Jacqueline Đăng

== Controversies ==
=== MPI 2022 Issue ===
The 2022 event, scheduled to be held in Uganda, was cancelled due to a lack of support from some countries. The originally planned coronation night on November 19 for the pageant was rescheduled due to tensions in Uganda sparked by an Ebola outbreak. These circumstances led local organizers to delay the competition, which the representative of the Philippines Herlene Budol wasn't initially expected to participate in. The current national license holder of the pageant, Wilbert Tolentino from the Philippines, initiated the claim that MPI broke the agreement while he was the licensee holder at that time.

=== MPI 2024 Issue ===
Chelsea Mandizha, representing the United Kingdom, was disqualified from a competition at the time due to allegations of physical aggression toward other contestants and misconduct toward staff and later that night the organizers announced that both of them could continue competing. During the live telecast of the 2024 edition, Miss Jordan, a finalist, walked off the stage. She alleged racism within the pageant, a claim that has generated significant attention and sparked widespread discussion among those involved in the competition.

Miss Planet Cambodia, Sreyneat Det, withdrew from the Miss Planet International final held in Phnom Penh, citing health issues as the reason for her decision. The announcement, initially made through a now-deleted social media post, was later confirmed by the event organizers. Following her withdrawal, the organizers appointed the competition's runner-up, Sovansonita Khon, as her replacement. Sovansonita expressed her commitment to representing Cambodia on the international stage during the event.

The contest was accused of renting 70 outfits from a Vietnamese designer but failing to return them.

== See also ==
- List of beauty pageants
