= Karina Kiseleva =

Belarusian beauty pageant winner

- Карина Киселёва
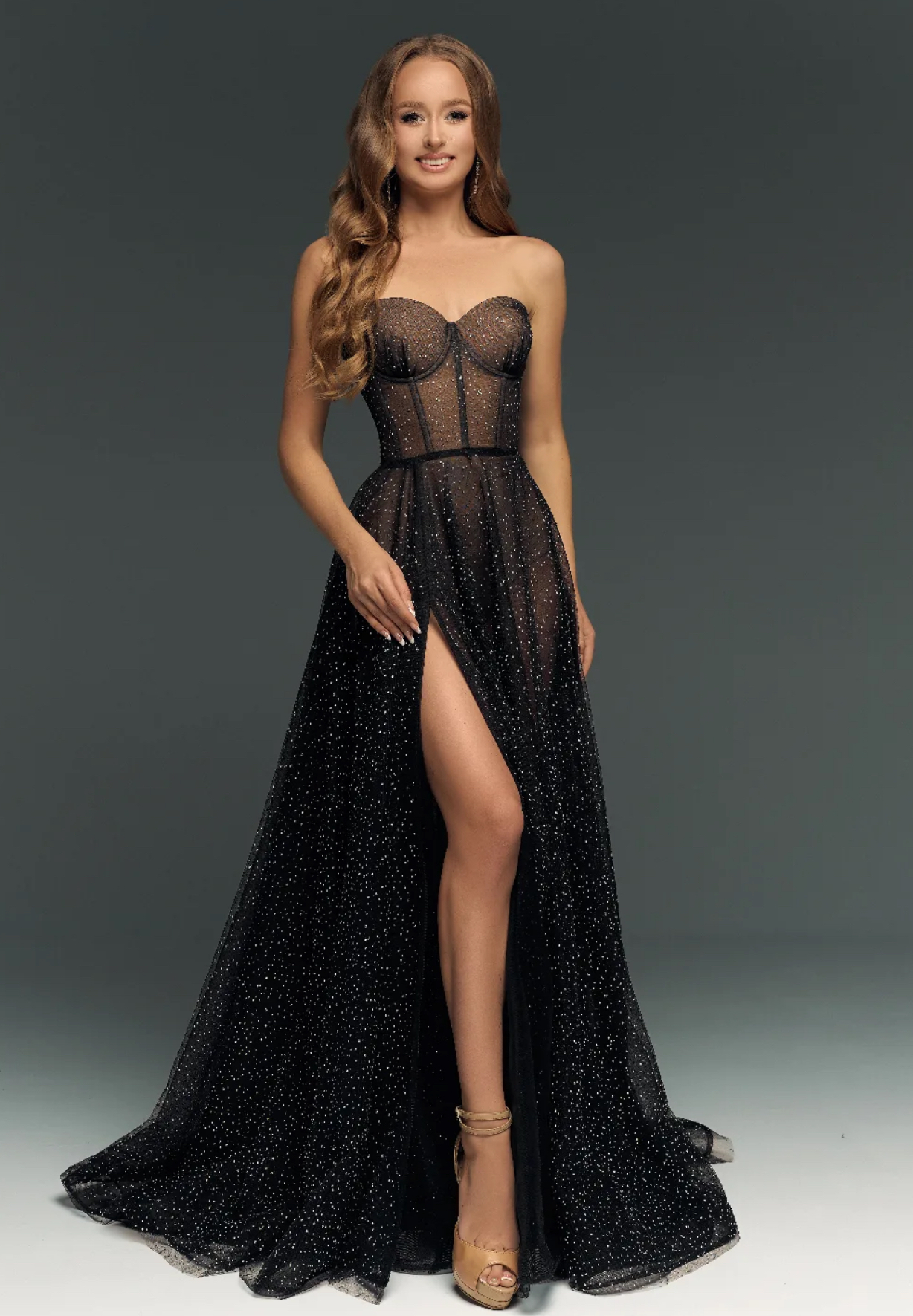
- Kiseleva in 2025
- Born: Karina Kiseleva; Minsk, Belarus
- Other names: Karyna Kisialiova
- Education: Moscow Aviation Institute
- Occupations: Beauty queen, model, lifestyle coach
- Known for: Various beauty pageant titles
- Height: 177 cm (5 ft 10 in)
- Beauty pageant titleholder
- Title: Miss Universe Belarus (2024)
- Years active: 2017–present
- Hair color: Light brown
- Eye color: Green

Karina Kiseleva (Belarusian: Карина Киселёва) is a Belarusian beauty pageant titleholder. She was crowned Miss Universe Belarus 2024, becoming the first representative from Belarus to compete at the Miss Universe pageant, but later withdrew from it. She has represented Belarus at more than 15 major international beauty competitions, including Miss United Continents, Miss Grand International, Miss International, and Miss Earth.

== Early life and education ==
Kiseleva was born in Minsk, Belarus. She is a graduate of the Moscow Aviation Institute, where she studied public relations and marketing. She is a trained professional dancer.

== Pageantry ==
Early international competitions

Kiseleva began competing internationally in the late 2010s.

In 2017, she participated in Miss Asia Pacific International 2017 and Miss University Mai 2017, which was held in Russia.

In 2018, she was appointed as Belarus's representative at the Miss United Continents pageant and Miss Mesoamerica (2018), where she was the 1st runner up.

In 2019, she represented Belarus at the Miss Planet International pageant, and in the same year, she was crowned Miss Grand Belarus and represented Belarus at the Miss Grand International. Later she competed at Miss Multiverse 2020, where she entered the Top 10, and received the award of Miss Fitness.

In 2022, she represented Belarus at Miss International 2022.

Miss Earth, Miss Eco and environmental advocacy

In 2023, Kiseleva was appointed Miss Earth Belarus, representing the country at the Miss Earth 2023 pageant. Her participation aligned closely with her advocacy platform, which emphasises environmental protection, including forest preservation, animal welfare, and sustainable living.

She was also later designated Miss Eco International Belarus 2024, reinforcing her association with environment-centered beauty competitions.

Miss Universe 2024

In 2024, Kiseleva was crowned Miss Universe Belarus 2024. The title carried historical significance, as it marked Belarus's first participation in the Miss Universe pageant. She was set to represent Belarus at Miss Universe 2024, held in Mexico, but later withdrew.
