= Miss Grand Philippines 2014 =

1st Miss Grand Philippines competition, beauty pageant edition

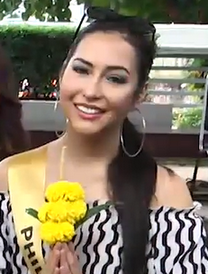
- Kimberly Karlsson, Miss Grand Philippines 2014
- Date: August 16, 2014
- Venue: GT-Toyota Asian Cultural Center, Quezon City, Metro Manila, Philippines
- Broadcaster: YouTube
- Entrants: 17
- Placements: 10
- Winner: Kimberly Karlsson; Oriental Mindoro
- Congeniality: Rosanna Andrea Reniva, Ilocos Sur
- Best National Costume: Kimberly Karlsson, Oriental Mindoro
- Photogenic: Ivy Meerry Enriquez, Bataan

Miss Grand Philippines 2014 was the first Miss Grand Philippines pageant, held at the GT-Toyota Asian Cultural Center in Quezon City, Metro Manila, Philippines, on August 16, 2014.

At the end of the event, Kimberly Karlsson of Oriental Mindoro was crowned Miss Grand Philippines 2014. Karlsson represented the Philippines at Miss Grand International 2014, held in Thailand.

The pageant was managed by John Dela Vega, and the contest's grand final round was also attended by Miss Grand International 2013, Janelee Chaparro of Puerto Rico, as well as the president of Miss Grand International, Nawat Itsaragrisil.

== Result ==
=== Placements ===
Placement	Contestant
Miss Grand Philippines 2014	#9 Oriental Mindoro – Kimberly Karlsson
1st Runner-Up	#7 Surigao del Sur – Rosevemme Fajardo
2nd Runner-Up	#15 Tarlac – Theresa Erna Gomez
Top 10	#1 Bataan – Ivy Meerry Enriquez; #3 Ilocos Sur – Rosanna Andrea Reniva; #5 Dagupan – Cynthia Caldona; #8 Surigao del Norte – Hyra Desiree Betito; #11 La Union – Jean Marie Feliciano; #13 Kalinga – Apple Ann Bartolome; #17 Valenzuela – Maria Jessica Oribe
Special awards
Miss Friendship	#3 Ilocos Sur – Rosanna Andrea Reniva
Miss Photogenic	#1 Bataan – Ivy Meerry Enriquez
Best in Swimwear	#11 La Union – Jean Marie Feliciano

== Delegates ==
17 delegates competed for the title.

- #1 Bataan – Ivy Meerry Enriquez
- #3 Ilocos Sur – Rosanna Andrea Reniva
- #4 Camarines Sur – Joanne Tampoco
- #5 Dagupan – Cynthia Caldona
- #6 Manila – Shaira Nicole Novicio
- #7 Surigao del Sur – Rosevemme Fajardo
- #8 Surigao del Norte – Hyra Desiree Betito
- #9 Oriental Mindoro – Kimberly Karlsson
- #10 Bacolod – Kathleen Matillano
- #11 La Union – Jean Marie Feliciano
- #13 Kalinga – Apple Ann Bartolome
- #14 La Union – Kristine Lozano
- #15 Tarlac – Theresa Erna Gomez
- #16 Metro Manila – Princess Dana Gail Rockwell
- #17 Valenzuela – Maria Jessica Oribe
- #18 Isabela – Princess Airaden Gonzales
- #19 Zambales – Kristine Mae Rojas
- #21 Gapan City – Bianca Ruth Mendoza
