= Miss Grand Belarus =

Beauty pageant in Belarus

- Formation: 2013
- Type: Beauty pageant
- Headquarters: Minsk
- Location: Belarus
- Members: Miss Grand International
- Official language: Belarusian; Russian
- National director: Anton Sergeevi (2022)
- Parent organization: Anton Sergeevi Model Agency (2022); Miss Queen Belarus Org. (2020, 2023)

Miss Grand Belarus is a national beauty pageant title awarded to Belarusian representatives competing at the Miss Grand International pageant. The title was first mentioned in 2013 when a Moscow-based model, Veronika Chachyna, was announced as the Belarusian candidate to compete at the inaugural edition of the mentioned international pageant in Thailand. Nevertheless, Chachyna withdrew from the competition. Since the first partaking in 2015, all Belarusian representatives at Miss Grand International were appointed to the position without organising the respective national pageants.

== History ==
Belarus officially debuted in the Miss Grand International in 2015, represented by Luliia Kuper, who was directly invited by the international organizer to participate. However, in 2013, an announcement of the country representative for the 2013 international competition was made, but the mentioned candidate, Veronika Chachyna, withdrew from the competition, after she obtained the top 10 placement and a special title of Miss Europe in another international pageant, Miss Supranational 2013, held in Minsk, the capital of her home country.

Since their first participation in 2015, Belarusian representatives at Miss Grand International were all appointed by the respective licensees, and all of them were unplaced at the international competition.

Titleholder gallery

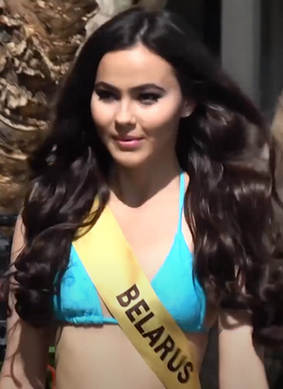
Luliia Kuper
Miss Grand Belarus 2015

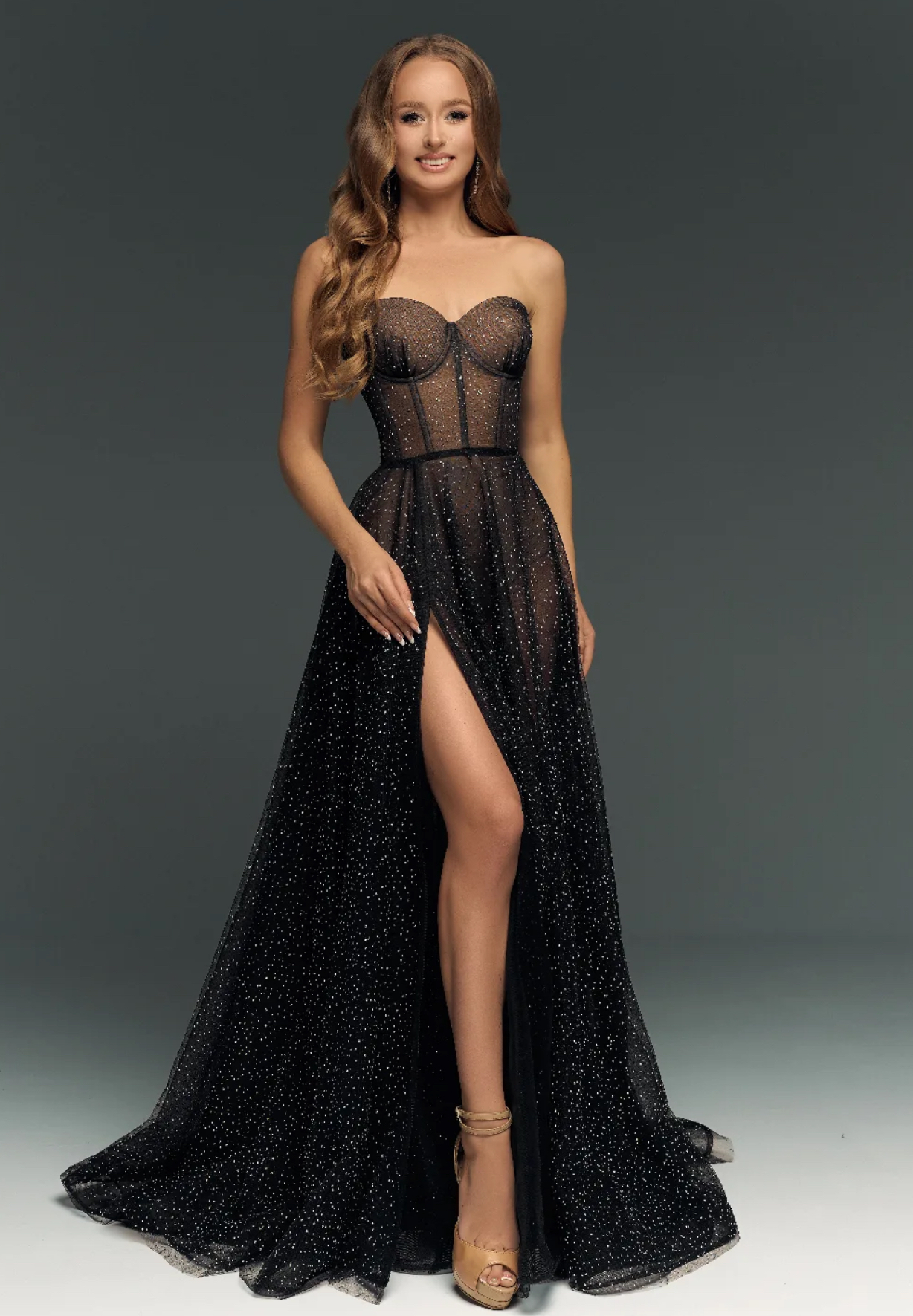
Karyna Kisialiova
Miss Grand Belarus 2019

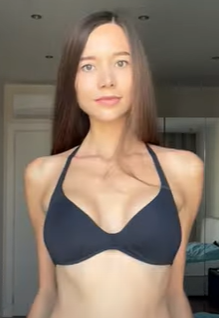
Marina Viazankova
Miss Grand Belarus 2022

== Titleholders ==
The following is a list of Belarusian representatives at the Miss Grand International contest.

Year	Miss Grand Belarus	Original National Title	Competition Performance	
Year	Miss Grand Belarus	Original National Title	Placement	Other Award(s)
2013	Veronika Chachyna	Miss Supranational Belarus 2013	Unable to compete	
2015	Luliia Kuper	—	Unplaced	
2017	Panova Denisovna	—	Unplaced	
2019	Karina Kiseleva	—	Unplaced	
2020	Polli Cannabis	World Next Top Model Russia 2014 Finalist	Unplaced	
2022	Marina Viazankova	—	Unplaced	
2023	Ekaterina Agapava	4th vice-miss Krasa Rossii 2019	Unplaced	
2024	No representatives			
No representatives between 2025 - present
Color keys for the Placements at Miss Grand International Declared as the winner Ended as a runner-up (Top 5) Ended as a finalist (Top 10) Ended as a semifinalist (Top 20/21)
