= Miss Asia Pacific International 2017 =

- Date: 29 November 2017
- Venue: Newport Performing Arts Theater of Resorts World Manila, Pasay
- Entrants: 42
- Placements: 15
- Winner: Francielly Ouriques; Brazil
- Congeniality: Louisa Brown (Australia)
- Best National Costume: Rita Nurmaliza (Indonesia)
- Photogenic: Lydia Simonis (Cook Islands)

Miss Asia Pacific International 2017 was the second Miss Asia Pacific International pageant, held at the Newport Performing Arts Theater in Pasay, Metro Manila, Philippines, on November 29, 2017.

Tessa Helena le Conge of the Netherlands crowned Francielly Ouriques of Brazil at the end of the event.

== Results ==
=== Placements ===
Placement	Contestant
Miss Asia Pacific International 2017	Brazil – Francielly Ouriques
1st Runner-Up	New Zealand – Acacia Walker
2nd Runner-Up	Honduras – Valeria Cardona
3rd Runner-Up	Netherlands – Morgan Doelwijt
4th Runner-Up	Philippines – Ilene Astrid de Vera
Top 10	Costa Rica – Kimberly Porras; Japan – Yuki Sonoda; Mongolia – Anundari Dashdorj; Nicaragua – Katering Medina; South Africa – Chanelle Soncini
Top 15	Colombia – Yhully Bell Gómez; Cook Islands – Lydia Simonis; Egypt – Farah Kamal; Peru – Patricia Seminario; Russia – Viktoriya Dashieva

=== Special awards ===
Awards	Name	Placement	Country
Miss Congeniality	Louisa Brown	Winner	Australia
Miss Photogenic	Lydia Simonis	Winner	Cook Islands
Best in Hairstyle	Acacia Walker	Winner	New Zealand
Miss Zanea Shoes	Sonika Roy	Winner	India
Miss Zanea Shoes	Francielly Ouriques	1st Runner up	Brazil
Miss Vitress	Acacia Walker	Winner	New Zealand
Miss Flawlessly U	Cardona Valeria	Winner	Honduras
Miss Stronghold Insurance	Kah Yin Lai	Winner	Malaysia
Miss Sheridan Palawan	Francielly Ouriques	Winner	Brazil

=== Special Awards II ===
Awards	1st Place	2nd Place	3rd Place
Darling of the Press	Hasini Samuel; Sri Lanka	Aylasha Ramrachia; Mauritius	Vuong Thanh Tuyen; Vietnam
Best in National Costume	Rita Nurmaliza; Indonesia	Viktoriya Dashieva; Russia	Francielly Ouriques; Brazil
Best in Swimsuit	Francielly Ouriques; Brazil	Chanelle Soncini; South Africa	Ilene Astrid de Vera; Philippines
Best in Evening Gown	Valeria Cardona; Honduras	Ilene Astrid de Vera; Philippines	Vuong Thanh Tuyen; Vietnam
Best in Palawan Festival Costume	Francielly Ouriques; Brazil	Katering Medina; Nicaragua	Ilene Astrid de Vera; Philippines
Best in Talent	Lydia Simonis; Cook Islands	Rita Nurmaliza; Indonesia	Tiare Faundez; Easter Island

== Contestants ==
Forty-two contestants competed for the 2017 MAPI title:

Country/Territory	Delegate
Australia	Louisa Brown
Belarus	Karina Kisialiova
Brazil	Francielly Ouriques
Canada	Maleeka Singh
China	Wen Dou
Colombia	Yhully Bell Gomez
Cook Islands	Lydia Simonis - Tariu
Costa Rica	Kimberly Porras Boza
Easter Island	Tiare Faundez
Egypt	Farah Kamal Abou-Seada
El Salvador	Janeth Steffany Erazo
France	Laura Deflandre
Germany	Anastasia Bersch
Guam	Annania Grace Nauta
Honduras	Valeria Cardona
Hong Kong	O Ka Ki
Iceland	Donna Eunice Cruz
India	Sonika Roy
Indonesia	Rita Nurmaliza
Japan	Yuki Sonoda
Lebanon	Souad Hanna
Macau	Si Yi Yuan
Malaysia	Kah Yin Lai
Mauritius	Aylasha Ramrachia
Mexico	Jade Yañez
Monaco	Anundari Dashdorj
Myanmar	Htwe Ei Kyaw
Nepal	Sahara Basnet
Netherlands	Morgan Doelwijt
New Zealand	Acacia Walker
Nicaragua	Katering Medina
Peru	Patricia Seminario
Philippines	Ilene De Vera
Russia	Viktoria Dashieva
Singapore	Lynette Chua
South Africa	Chanelle Soncini
South Korea	Song Hyeon-jin
Sri Lanka	Hasini Samuel
Suriname	Francisca Wong Loi Sing
Taiwan	Wen Yin Ting
Thailand	Lisa Suwannaketkarn
Vietnam	Vuong Thanh Tuyen

== See also ==
- List of beauty contests
- Miss Asia Pacific International
