= Magandang Dilag =

2023 Philippine television drama series

- Title card
- Also known as: Beautiful Revenge
- Genre: Drama
- Created by: John Kenneth De Leon
- Written by: Marlon G. Miguel; Angeli Delgado; Jake Somera; Meryl Bunyi; Nehemiarey Dallego
- Directed by: Don Michael Perez; Rechie del Carmen; Richard Arellano
- Creative director: Aloy Adlawan
- Starring: Herlene Budol
- Theme music composer: Francis Kiko Salazar
- Opening theme: "Magandang Dilag" by John Rex Baculfo
- Country of origin: Philippines
- Original language: Tagalog
- No. of episodes: 99

Production
- Executive producer: James Ryan L. Manabat
- Camera setup: Multiple-camera setup
- Running time: 21–28 minutes
- Production company: GMA Entertainment Group

Original release
- Network: GMA Network
- Release: June 26 – November 10, 2023

Magandang Dilag (transl. beautiful splendor / international title: Beautiful Revenge) is a 2023 Philippine television drama series broadcast by GMA Network. Directed by Don Michael Perez, it stars Herlene Budol in the title role. It premiered on June 26, 2023 on the network's Afternoon Prime line up. The series concluded on November 10, 2023, with a total of 99 episodes.

The series is streaming online on YouTube.

== Cast and characters ==
Cast

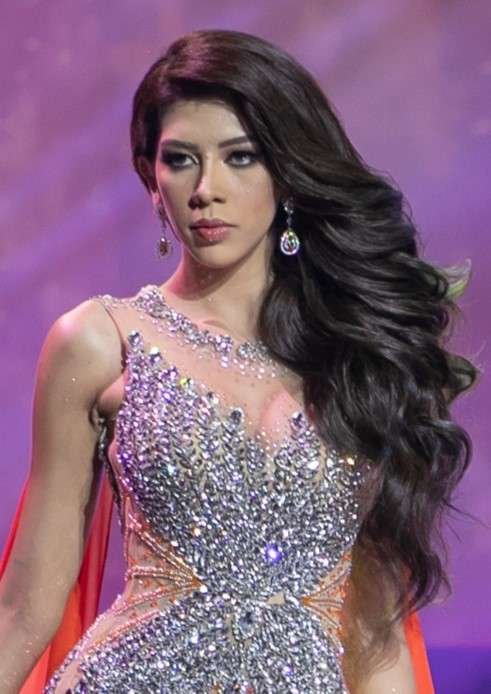
Herlene Budol

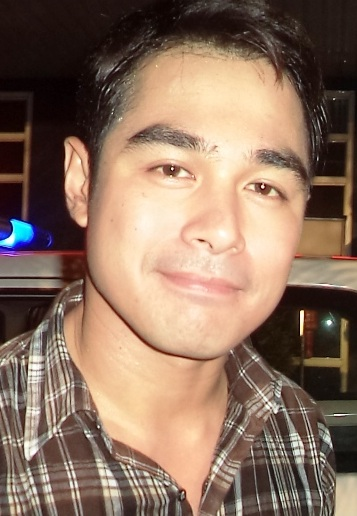
Benjamin Alves

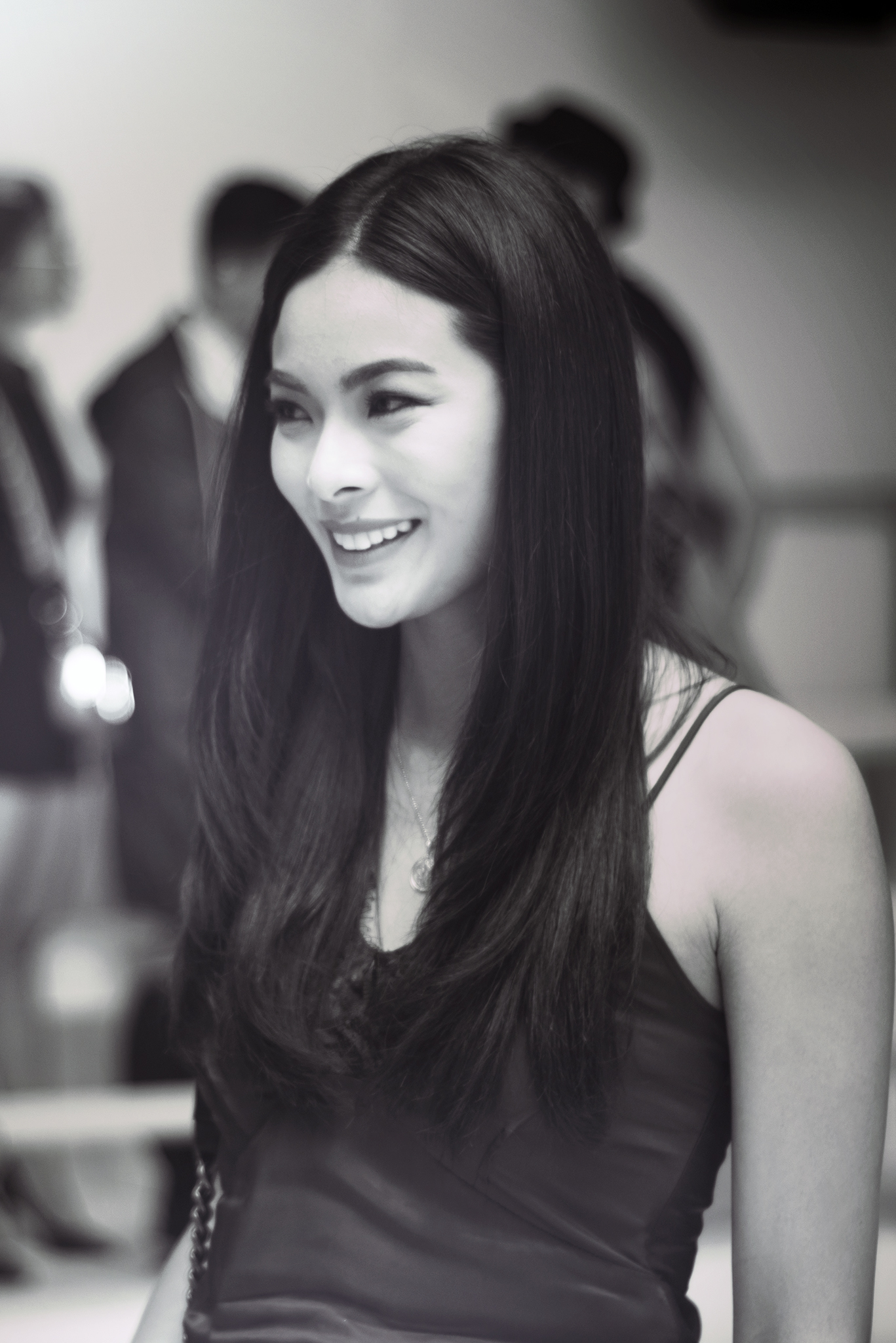
Maxine Medina

Lead cast

- Herlene Budol as Georgina "Gigi" De Jesus-Robles / Gretchen "Greta V." Veneracion

Supporting cast

- Benjamin Alves as Ericson "Eric" Oliveros
- Rob Gomez as Jared Illusorio
- Maxine Medina as Blaire Escudero
- Sandy Andolong as Luisa De Jesus
- Chanda Romero as Sofia Veneracion/Robles
- Adrian Alandy as Magnus Illusorio
- Bianca Manalo as Riley Tevez-Illusorio
- Muriel Lomadilla as Madonna "Donna" Arevalo
- Prince Clemente as Cyrus
- Angela Alarcon as Alfredo "Allison" Flores
- Jade Tecson as Jadah Flores

Guest cast

- Al Tantay as Joaquin Robles
- Ramjean Entera as younger Georgina "Gigi" De Jesus Robles
- Jhoana Marie Tan as Thelma Sanchez
- Zonia Mejia as Bella Veneracion Robles
- Vincent Magbanua as younger Magnus Illusorio
- Bryce Eusebio as younger Jared Illusorio
- Jordan Castillo as Norman
- Elle Ramirez as Lily Bunayog
- Divina Valencia as Lily's mother
- Clarence Delgado as Pio Salazar's son
- Ira Ruzz as Abegail "Abby" Menor
- Richard Yap as Robert Jose "RJ" Tanyag
- John Rex Baculfo as a fashion show performer
- Faye Lorenzo as Missy Chan
- Julie Lee as Noreen Costales
- Patricia Tumulak as Tess
- Dos Quizon as Alfredo Flores
- Victor Sy as Pablo Ikaru

== Casting ==
In October 2023, actor Richard Yap made a cameo appearance as RJ Tanyag, a hospital physician who originated from the Philippine television medical drama series Abot-Kamay na Pangarap.

== Production ==
Principal photography commenced on November 30, 2022.

== Ratings ==
According to AGB Nielsen Philippines' Nationwide Urban Television Audience Measurement People in television homes, the pilot episode of Magandang Dilag earned a 9.7% rating.

== Accolades ==
Accolades received by Magandang Dilag
Year	Award	Category	Recipient	Result	Ref.
2024	5th VP Choice Awards	TV Series of the Year (Afternoon)	Magandang Dilag	Nominated	
2024	5th VP Choice Awards	TV Actor of the Year (Afternoon)	Benjamin Alves	Nominated	
2024	5th VP Choice Awards	TV Actress of the Year (Afternoon)	Herlene Budol	Nominated	
