= CJ Opiaza =

Filipino model and beauty pageant titleholder

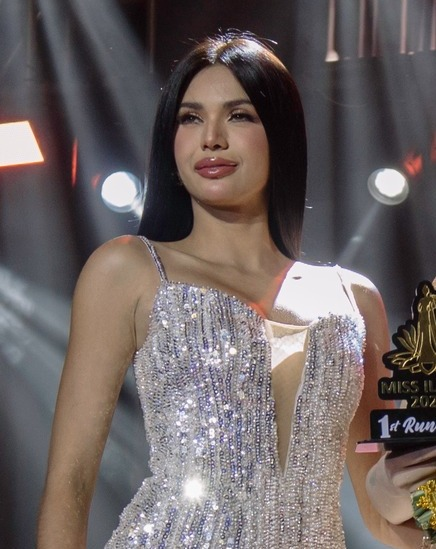
- Opiaza in 2025
- Born: Christine Juliane Hinkle Opiaza; July 8, 1998 (age 28); Castillejos, Zambales, Philippines
- Education: Lyceum of Subic Bay (BSBA)
- Beauty pageant titleholder
- Title: Miss Grand Philippines 2024; Miss Grand International 2024
- Major competitions: Binibining Pilipinas 2022 (Unplaced); Miss Universe Philippines 2023 (1st Runner-Up); Miss Grand Philippines 2024 (Winner); Miss Grand International 2024 (Winner; Assumed)

Christine Juliane Hinkle Opiaza (born July 8, 1998) is a Filipina model and beauty pageant titleholder who was crowned Miss Grand International 2024 after originally finishing as first runner-up. She assumed the title following the dethronement of the original winner, Rachel Gupta of India, by the Miss Grand International organization She became the first Filipina to hold the Miss Grand International title.

She also competed at Binibining Pilipinas 2022, but didn't placed and a year after she competed again and hailed as first runner-up at Miss Universe Philippines 2023.

== Early life and education ==
Christine Juliane Opiaza was born on July 8, 1998 in Subic, Zambales. She began competing in beauty pageants in 2012 in pursuit of a scholarship to the Lyceum of Subic Bay. Succeeding the second year she, gained the scholarship, and was later Miss Lyceum 2015. She graduated with a degree in Human Resource Development Management in 2018.

== Pageantry ==
=== Binibining Pilipinas 2022 ===
Opiaza represented Zambales in Binibining Pilipinas 2022, and went unplaced. Nicole Borromeo of Cebu won the pageant.

=== Miss Universe Philippines 2023 ===
On February 18, 2023, Opiaza represented Zambales and was first runner up at Miss Universe Philippines 2023.

At the coronation night, she wore a gown designed by Mak Tumang inspired by the local legend of Mangalagar, the Zambales goddess of good grace.

In the question-and-answer rounds, Opiaza was asked about a Goldman Sachs study predicting that artificial intelligence could affect 300 million full-time jobs globally. In her answer, she acknowledged the role of technological progress but stressed that such change should not come at the expense of human labor. Opiaza emphasized the importance of valuing manpower as a key driver of economic development and advocated for a balanced approach between AI integration and workforce preservation. She was later asked about a tourism campaign misattributed to the Department of Tourism, “We give the world our best.” Opiaza answered that the Philippines’ greatest offering is its people’s commitment to purpose, gratitude, and creating meaningful change. She highlighted the importance of personal growth, community impact, and striving for continuous development as reflections of the country’s best.

=== Miss Grand Philippines 2024 ===
Opiaza represented Castillejos, Zambales, and won Miss Grand Philippines 2024, on September 29, 2024. In the question-and-answer round, she answered a question on whether beauty queens should receive the same incentives as Olympic athletes, emphasizing that the opportunity to inspire others and advocate for meaningful causes is a reward in itself. She was crowned by outgoing titleholder Nikki de Moura of Cagayan de Oro.

=== Miss Grand International 2024 ===
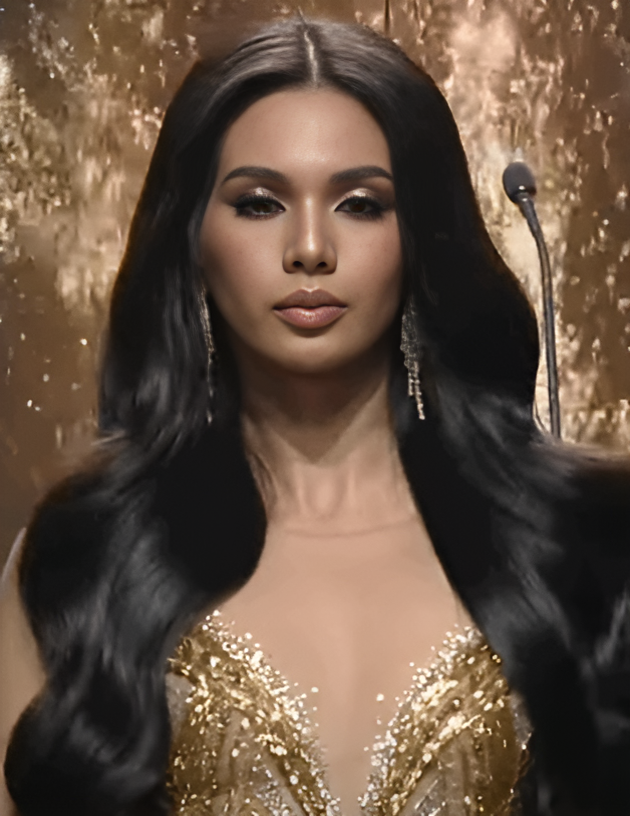
Opiaza at Miss Grand International 2024

Opiaza represented the Philippines and was first runner-up at Miss Grand International 2024, held in Cambodia and Thailand. Throughout the competition, she was considered a strong contender by several media outlets. For the national costume competition, Opiaza wore a design by Patrick Isorena, inspired by the anahaw—the national leaf of the Philippines—symbolizing Filipino identity and resilience.

During the coronation night, she wore a gown designed by Filipino designer Mak Tumang. In the question-and-answer segment, she was asked to identify the most critical issue facing the world and propose a solution. She highlighted civil war and violence as the most pressing global challenges, emphasizing the human cost of conflict and advocating for greater kindness, respect, and unity among people.

First runner-up equaled the highest placement ever achieved by a Filipino contestant at Miss Grand International, previously reached by Nicole Cordoves in 2016 and Samantha Bernardo in 2020.

==== Assumption and reign ====
On May 28, 2025, Miss Grand International 2024 Rachel Gupta resigned, citing organizational issues, including unmet commitments and alleged mistreatment. The Miss Grand International organization responded, attributing the decision to her alleged failure to fulfill assigned duties.

On May 29, the organization confirmed Opiaza was the new titleholder, making her the first Filipino to hold the title. She was officially crowned on June 3 by Nawat Itsaragrisil, the president of the Miss Grand International organization, at the MGI Hall in Bangkok, Thailand. For the event, she wore an evening gown designed by Mak Tumang. Gupta extended her well wishes to Opiaza for her reign but cautioned her to be mindful and protect herself from the organization.

In her capacity as the first-runner up, Opiaza visited South Korea, alongside other runners-up of Miss Grand International 2024. During her reign as the Miss Grand International 2024, she travelled to Thailand, Myanmar, China, India, Malaysia, Laos, Panama, the United States, Japan, Vietnam and her home country of the Philippines.

== Advocacy and platforms ==
Opiaza co-founded the Passion for Joy Initiative with her sister, Princess Juliane, to advocate for animal welfare. The initiative has partnered with The Homeless Dog Shelter Subic to provide a safe haven for rescued animals.

== Other ventures ==
Opiaza operates The Canvas, a pasarela coaching school, where she has trained several Filipina beauty pageant titleholder including Dia Maté (Reina Hispanoamericana 2025), Alethea Ambrosio (Miss Supranational Asia and Oceania 2024), and Alexie Brooks (Miss Eco International 2025).

As a model, she has participated in events including the 2019 Mega Fashion Week for L’Oréal, the 2021 Philippine Fashion Week Spring/Summer Collection, and the 2025 Bench Body of Work runway. In February 2025, she signed an endorsement deal and became a brand ambassador for Bench.

Awards and achievements
Preceded by Rachel Gupta (Resigned)	Miss Grand International (Assumed); 2024	Succeeded by Emma Tiglao
Preceded by Ni Ni Lin Eain	1st Runner-up Miss Grand International; 2024	Succeeded by Talita Hartmann (Assumed)
Preceded by Nikki de Moura (Cagayan de Oro)	Miss Grand Philippines; 2024	Succeeded by Emma Tiglao (Pampanga)
Preceded by Annabelle McDonnell	1st Runner-up Miss Universe Philippines; 2023	Succeeded by Stacey Gabriel
