= Miss Grand Philippines =

National beauty pageant competition in the Philippines

- Established: 16 August 2014; 12 years ago
- Type: Beauty pageant
- Members: Miss Grand International; MGI All Stars
- Official language: English; Filipino
- National Director: Emma Tiglao (2026 – Present)
- President and CEO: Jojo Bragais
- Executive Partner: Nawat Itsaragrisil
- Current titleholder: Angelica Lopez; Palawan
- Parent organization: Reina Filipinas (2026 – Present)

Miss Grand Philippines is a female national beauty pageant in the Philippines, launched in 2014 by John Dela Vega, who was also the founder of the "House of JDV", one of the country's most recognized pageant training camps. The winner of the contest represents the country at its parent international platform, Miss Grand International. Since 2026, in cooperation with the Reina Filipinas, the winners of the pageant are assigned to participate in the Miss Grand International and MGI All Stars.

In 2016, the competition license was transferred to Binibining Pilipinas Charities, Inc.. Under its supervision, from 2016 to 2022, majority of Filipino representatives at the Miss Grand International pageant were directly determined through the Binibining Pilipinas contest, except for the 2020 season, wherein the runner-up of the previous edition was appointed to participate. The Miss Grand Philippines pageant, on the other hand, returned as a separate platform in 2023 when the franchise was passed to the ALV Pageant Circle under the leadership of talent manager and businessman Mr. Arnold L. Vegafria.

Since the inception of the Miss Grand International pageant in 2013, the Philippines has secured its first win after Christine Juliane Opiaza assumed the title of Miss Grand International 2024 following the dethronement of Rachel Gupta of India. The first runner-up positions were obtained twice, by Nicole Cordoves in 2016 and Samantha Bernardo in 2020.

The following year, Opiaza crowned Emma Mary Tiglao as her successor as Miss Grand International 2025, making it the first-ever back-to-back titles in the history of Miss Grand International.

== Background ==
=== History ===
Before the 2020s, the Philippines had only one Miss Grand national standalone pageant, which took place in 2014 under the direction of John Dela Vega, who served as the national licensee from 2013 to 2015. The remaining representatives were either chosen on the Binibining Pilipinas stage or appointed, such as Parul Shah, who was elected Binibining Pilipinas Tourism in the Binibining Pilipinas 2014 pageant, but was later assigned to represent the country at the Miss Grand International 2015 pageant instead; as well as Samantha Bernardo, who was appointed Miss Grand Philippines 2020 after obtaining the second runner-up position at the Binibining Pilipinas 2019 pageant.

The standalone Miss Grand Philippines competition was retrieved in 2023 after the Miss World Philippines organizer, chaired by Arnold Vegafria of ALV Pageant Circle, took over the franchise from Binibining Pilipinas Charities, Inc. in late 2022. The pageant was later discontinued in 2026, when the franchise to send the Philippine representative to Miss Grand International was transferred to Jojo Bragais, with Emma Tiglao appointed as national director. A new national platform, Reina Filipinas, was subsequently established to select one representative for Miss Grand International 2026 and two delegates for MGI All Stars 2nd Edition.

=== Titles ===
Membership	Year	Number of wins
Miss Grand International	2023 — 2025	2 (2024, 2025)
Reina Hispanoamericana	2023, 2025	0
Miss Asia Pacific International	2025	0
Face of Beauty International	2025 — 2026	1 (2025)
Miss Tourism International	2026	0
Miss Interglobal	2026	1 (2026)
Miss Teen International	2024	0
Miss Eco Teen International	2023	0

== Editions ==
The following list is the edition detail of the Miss Grand Philippines contest.

Edition	Date	Final Venue	Entrants	Competition Result			Ref.
Edition	Date	Final Venue	Entrants	Miss Grand Philippines	1st Runner-Up	2nd Runner-Up	Ref.
1st	August 16, 2014	GT-Toyota Asian Cultural Center, Quezon City, Metro Manila	19	Kimberly Karlsson; Oriental Mindoro	Rosevemme Marie Fajardo; Surigao del Sur	Mary Theresa Erna Gomez; Tarlac	
2nd	July 13, 2023	SM Mall of Asia Arena, Pasay, Metro Manila	30	Nikki de Moura; Cagayan de Oro	Shanon Tampon; Caloocan	Charie Manalo Sergio; Antique	
3rd	September 28, 2024	Newport Performing Arts Theater, Pasay, Metro Manila	20	Christine Juliane Opiaza; Zambales	Jubilee Therese Acosta; Manila	Alexandra Mae Rosales; Laguna	
4th	August 24, 2025	SM Mall of Asia Arena, Pasay, Metro Manila	29	Emma Mary Tiglao; Pampanga	Margarette Briton; Bicol Region	Beatriz Angela Ocampo; Rizal	

== Titleholders ==
Year	Represented	Miss Grand Philippines
2014	Oriental Mindoro	Kimberly Karlsson
2013, 2015 – 2022: Supplemental title under Binibining Pilipinas
2023	Cagayan De Oro	Nikki de Moura
2024	Castillejos	Christine Juliane Opiaza
2025	Pampanga	Emma Mary Tiglao
2026 – Present: Principal title under Reina Filipinas

== International placements ==
=== Miss Grand International ===
Year	Delegate	Represented	Title	Placement	Special Award(s)	Ref.
Representatives under the directorship of John Dela Vega
2013	Annalie Forbes	Bulacan	Binibining Pilipinas; 2012 2nd Runner-Up	3rd Runner-Up	—	
2014	Kimberly Karlsson	Oriental Mindoro	Miss Grand Philippines 2014	Unplaced	—	
Representatives under the directorship of Stella Márquez Araneta
2015	Parul Shah	Pangasinan	Binibining Pilipinas; Grand International 2015	3rd Runner-Up	Best National Costume	
2016	Nicole Cordoves	Makati	Binibining Pilipinas; Grand International 2016	1st Runner-Up	—	
2017	Elizabeth Clenci	Mandaue	Binibining Pilipinas; Grand International 2017	2nd Runner-Up	—	
2018	Eva Patalinjug	Cebu	Binibining Pilipinas; Grand International 2018	Unplaced	—	
2019	Samantha Ashley Lo^{[α]}	Cebu	Binibining Pilipinas; Grand International 2019	Unplaced	—	
2019	Maria Andrea Abesamis	Pasig	Binibining Pilipinas; Grand International 2019	Did not compete	—	
2020	Samantha Mae Bernardo	Palawan	Binibining Pilipinas; Grand International 2020	1st Runner-Up	—	
2021	Samantha Alexandra Panlilio	Cavite	Binibining Pilipinas; Grand International 2021	Unplaced	—	
2022	Roberta Angela Tamondong	San Pablo	Binibining Pilipinas; Grand International 2022	5th Runner-Up^{[β]}	—	
Representatives under the directorship of Arnold Vegafria
2023	Nikki de Moura	Cagayan de Oro	Miss Grand Philippines 2023	Unplaced	—	
2024	Christine Juliane Opiaza	Castillejos	Miss Grand Philippines 2024	Miss Grand International 2024^{[γ]}	—	
2025	Emma Mary Tiglao	Pampanga	Miss Grand Philippines 2025	Miss Grand International 2025	Country’s Power of the Year	
Representatives under the directorship of Emma Mary Tiglao
2026	Angelica Lopez	Palawan	Reina Filipinas Grand International 2026	Top 25	Best National Costume	

Note:
- ^α Resigned from the title after finishing the international contest in Venezuela. Bb. Pilipinas 2019 1st Runner-up, Maria Andrea Abesamis was later promoted to take over the title but did not go internationally to compete.
- ^β Initially finished as one of the top 20 finalists, she has since been promoted to the 5th Runner-up (Top 10) after Miss Grand Mauritius resigned from the title.
- ^γ Assumed the title of Miss Grand International 2024 after Rachel Gupta of India resigned from the title.

=== Reina Hispanoamericana ===
Year	Delegate	Represented	Placement	Special Award(s)	Ref.
2023	Michelle Arceo	Quezon City	2nd Runner-Up	—	
2026	Francesca Beatriz McLelland	Aklan	Top 13	—	

=== Miss Interglobal ===
Year	Delegate	Represented	Placement	Special Award(s)	Ref.
2026	Margarette Briton	Bicol Region	Miss Interglobal 2026	8 Special Awards: Best in Evening Gown Top 5; Best in Fashion Top 5; Best in National Costume Top 5; Best in Talent Top 5; Dinner Dress Award; National Costume Excellence Award; Social Impact Award; Star Connect Award	

=== Miss Tourism International ===
Year	Delegate	Represented	Placement	Special Award(s)	Ref.
2026	Michelle Arceo	Taguig	TBA	TBA	

=== Miss Asia Pacific International ===
Year	Delegate	Represented	Placement	Special Award(s)	Ref.
2025	Anita Rose Gomez	Zambales	1st Runner-Up	13 Special Awards: Best in Swimsuit; Best in Evening Gown 1st Runner-Up; Best in National Costume 1st Runner-Up; Darling of the Press 1st Runner-Up; Miss Brainstrong; Miss Cindyrella Drip; Miss Hotel 101; Miss Mestiza; Miss Pageanthology; Miss Pomp & Pageantry; Miss Zen Intitute; RMBZ Café Min’s Choice; RMBZ Nutramin’s Choice	

=== Face of Beauty International ===
Year	Delegate	Represented	Placement	Special Award(s)	Ref.
2025	Nikki Buenafe Cheveh	Quezon City	Face of Beauty; International 2025	2 Special Awards: Best in Swimwear Top 3; TJCOS Award	
2026	Beatriz Angela Ocampo	Rizal	2nd Runner-Up	2 Special Awards: Best in Evening Gown; Best in National Costume	

=== Miss Teen International ===
Year	Delegate	Represented	Placement	Special Award(s)	Ref.
2025	Anna Margaret Mercado	Aglipay	Top 16	1 Special Award: Best in Evening Gown	

=== Miss Eco Teen International ===
Year	Delegate	Represented	Placement	Special Award(s)	Ref.
2023	Francine Fatima Reyes	Tarlac	Top 11	—	

== Gallery ==
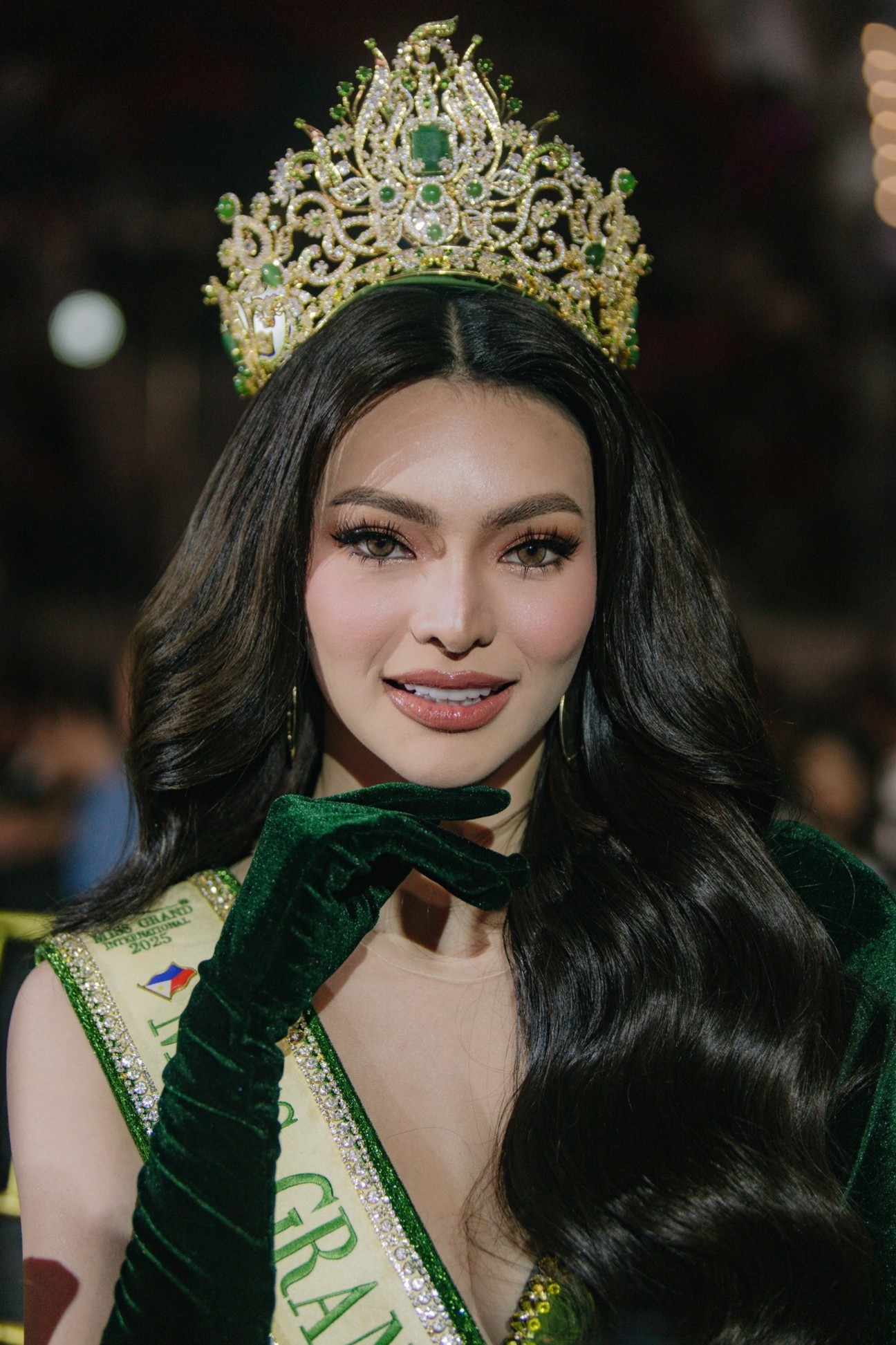
Miss Grand Philippines 2025
Emma Tiglao

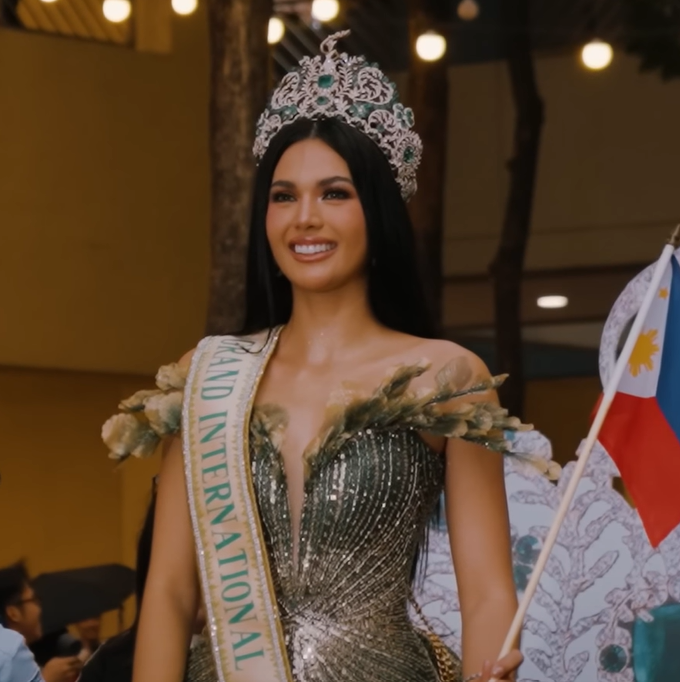
Miss Grand Philippines 2024
Christine Opiaza

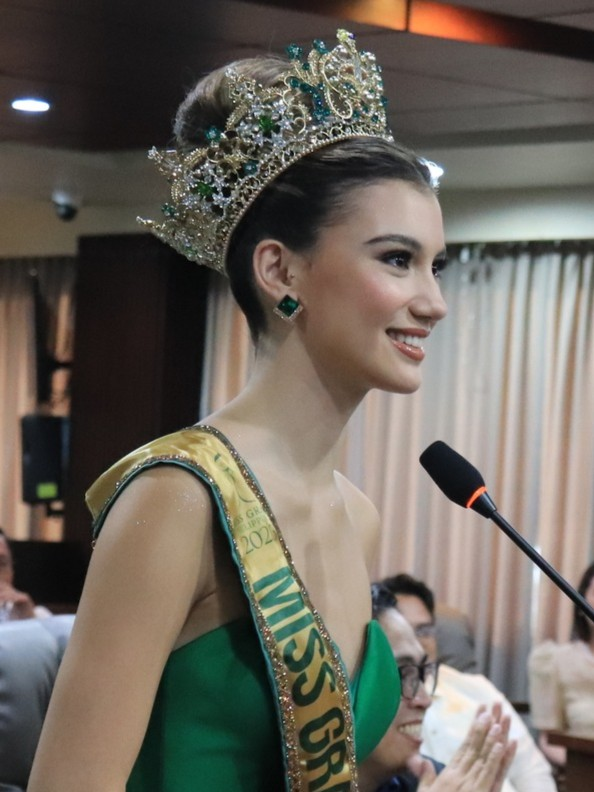
Miss Grand Philippines 2023
Nikki de Moura

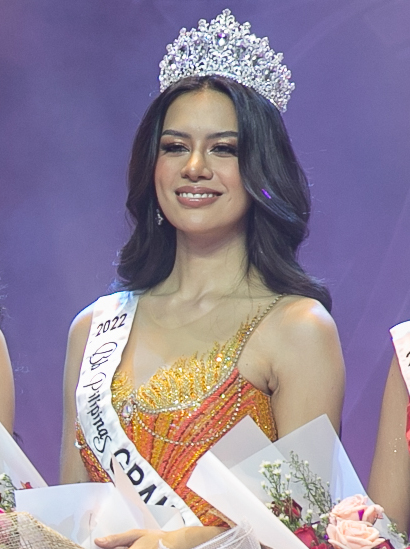
Miss Grand Philippines 2022
Roberta Tamondong

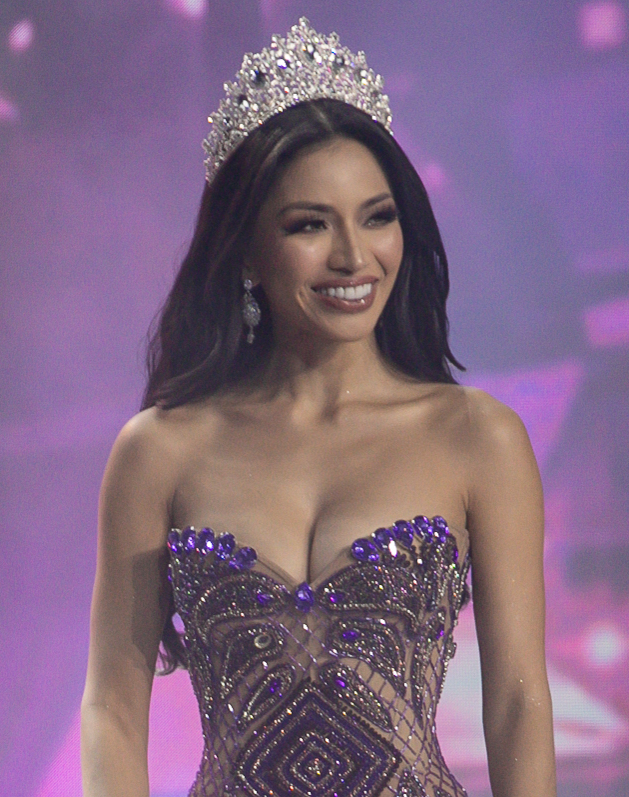
Miss Grand Philippines 2021
Samantha Panlilio

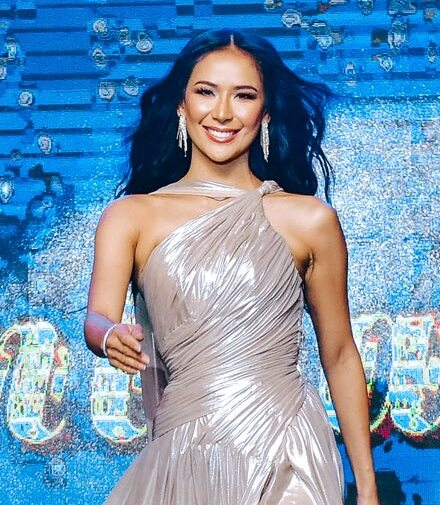
Miss Grand Philippines 2020
Samantha Bernardo

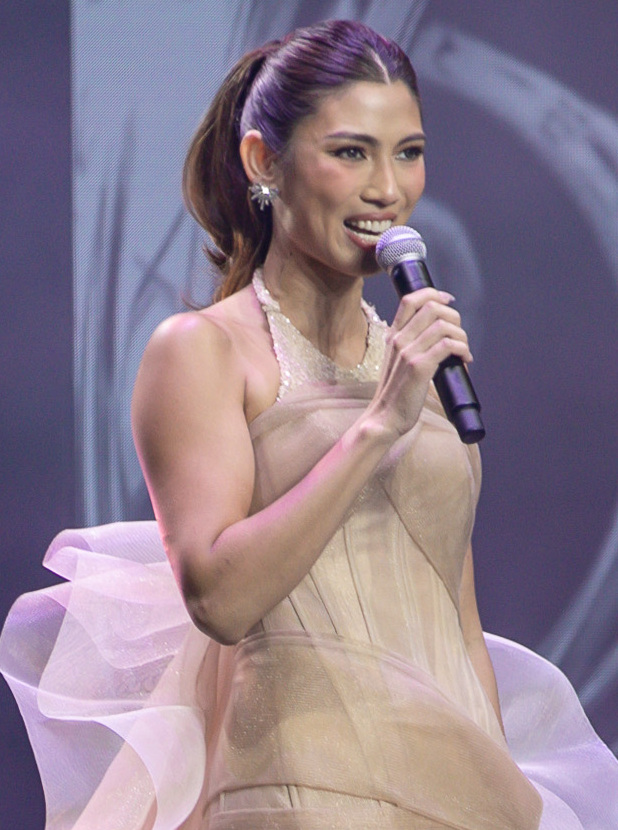
Miss Grand Philippines 2016
Nicole Cordoves

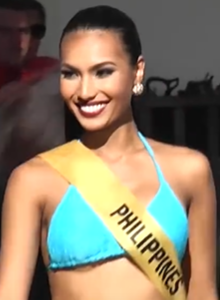
Miss Grand Philippines 2015
Parul Shah

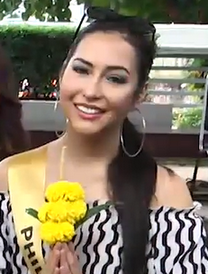
Miss Grand Philippines 2014
Kimberly Karlsson

== See also ==
- Miss Universe Philippines
- Miss World Philippines
- Miss Island Philippines
- The Miss Philippines
- Miss Philippines Earth
- Binibining Pilipinas
- Mutya ng Pilipinas
- Miss Pearl of the Orient Philippines
- Miss Republic of the Philippines
