= Reina Hispanoamericana 2023 =

32nd Reina Hispanoamericana pageant

- Date: January 28, 2024
- Venue: Salón Sirionó, Fexpocruz, Santa Cruz de la Sierra, Bolivia
- Broadcaster: Red Uno
- Entrants: 27
- Placements: 13
- Debuts: Indonesia; Trinidad and Tobago
- Withdrawals: Argentina; Equatorial Guinea; Germany; Haiti; Honduras; Panama
- Returns: Cuba; Curaçao; Europe
- Winner: Maricielo Gamarra; Peru
- Congeniality: Lucia Piñeyro; Uruguay
- Best National Costume: Carolina Pérez; Mexico

Reina Hispanoamericana 2023 was the 32nd Reina Hispanoamericana pageant, held at the Salón Sirionó, Fexpocruz in Santa Cruz de la Sierra, Bolivia, on January 28, 2024.

Arlette Rujel of Peru crowned Maricielo Gamarra of Peru as her successor at the end of the event. This marked Peru's first back-to-back and second-overall victory in the pageant.

== Results ==
=== Placements ===
Placement	Contestant
Reina Hispanoamericana 2023	Peru – Maricielo Gamarra
Virreina Hispanoamericana 2023	Venezuela – Fernanda Rojas
1st Runner-Up	Brazil – Cinthya Moura
2nd Runner-Up	Philippines – Michelle Arceo
3rd Runner-Up	Curaçao – Bianty Gomperts
4th Runner-Up	Colombia – Paula Andrea Alarcón
Top 13	Bolivia – Darla Reyes; Dominican Republic – Melissa Domínguez; Ecuador – Juliana Robles; Indonesia – Chesy Anribka Mose; Italy – Vanessa Ortiz; Mexico – Carolina Pérez §; Puerto Rico – Sarahí Figueroa

§ – Voted into the Top 13 by viewers

Order Of Announcements

Top 13

1. Mexico
2. Brazil
3. Venezuela
4. Colombia
5. Indonesia
6. Dominican Republic
7. Bolivia
8. Ecuador
9. Curaçao
10. Philippines
11. Puerto Rico
12. Italy
13. Peru

Top 6

1. Brazil
2. Curaçao
3. Colombia
4. Venezuela
5. Peru
6. Philippines

=== Special awards ===
Award	Contestant
Bicentenario Ambassadress	Mexico – Carolina Pérez
Miss Sports Kalomai	Peru – Maricielo Gamarra
Best National Costume	Mexico – Carolina Pérez
Nueva Santa Cruz Ambassadress	Mexico – Carolina Pérez
Philips Ambassadress	Venezuela – Fernanda Rojas
Best Smile by Orest	Venezuela – Fernanda Rojas
Miss Radiant Skin Solaris	Brazil – Cinthya Moura
Miss Ecojet	Venezuela – Fernanda Rojas
Best Medical Center Silhouette	Colombia – Paula Andrea Alarcón
Miss Congeniality	Uruguay – Lucia Piñeyro
Miss Elegance	Indonesia – Chesy Anribka Mose
The Experts' Favorite	Peru – Maricielo Gamarra
Fan Vote	Mexico – Carolina Pérez

== Contestants ==
Twenty-Seven contestants competed for the title.

Country/Territory	Contestant	Age (Note: Ages at the time of the pageant)	Hometown
Bolivia	Darla Reyes	19	Santa Cruz
Brazil	Cinthya Moura	23	Recife
Canada	Arshdeep Thind	21	Abbotsford
Chile	Amaya Butrón	20	Rancagua
Colombia	Paula Alarcón	22	Neiva
Costa Rica	Valeria Rees	30	Heredia
Cuba	Yisel Yero	26	Havana
Curaçao	Bianty Gomperts	25	Willemstad
Dominican Republic	Melissa Domínguez	28	Santo Domingo
Ecuador	Juliana Robles	20	Machala
El Salvador	Daniela Guevara	22	Usulután
Europe	Taria Burga	21	Genoa
Guatemala	Brianna Herrarte	19	Guatemala City
Indonesia	Chesy Anribka Mose	20	Manado
Italy	Vanessa Ortiz	27	Milan
Mexico	Carolina Pérez	27	Mazatlán
Nicaragua	Gabriela Rodríguez	24	Managua
Paraguay	Lorena Román	26	Minga Guazú
Peru	Maricielo Gamarra	29	San Martín
Philippines	Michelle Arceo	25	Quezon City
Portugal	Yeniffer Campos	33	Oeiras
Puerto Rico	Sarahí Figueroa	25	Arecibo
Spain	Sara Lahidalga	26	Vitoria-Gasteiz
Trinidad and Tobago	Andrea Montenegro	23	Port-of-Spain
United States	Estephania Cruz	26	New York City
Uruguay	Lucia Piñeyro	31	Young
Venezuela	Fernanda Rojas	20	Mérida
