= Nikki de Moura =

Filipino-Brazilian model and beauty pageant titleholder

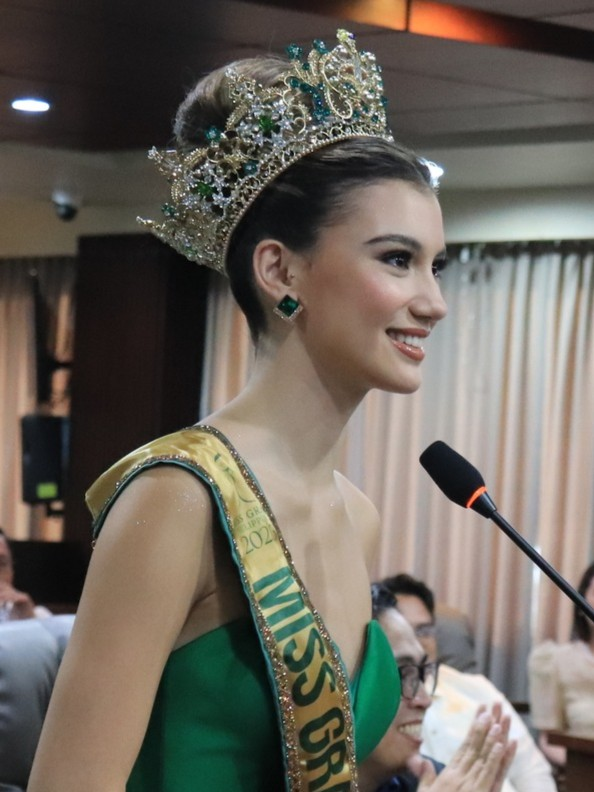
- De Moura in 2023
- Born: Nikki Advincula de Moura; November 15, 2003 (age 22); Rio de Janeiro, Rio de Janeiro, Brazil
- Height: 1.70 m (5 ft 7 in)
- Beauty pageant titleholder
- Title: Miss Teen Philippines 2019; Miss Grand Philippines 2023
- Hair color: Blonde; Brown (Natural)
- Eye color: Brown
- Major competitions: Miss Teen Philippines 2019; (Winner); Miss Grand Philippines 2023; (Winner); Miss Grand International 2023; (Unplaced)

Nikki Advincula de Moura (born November 15, 2003) is a Filipino-Brazilian model and beauty pageant titleholder who was crowned Miss Grand Philippines 2023. She represented the Philippines in the Miss Grand International 2023 competition held in Ho Chi Minh City, Vietnam on October 25, 2023.

== Early life ==
De Moura was born on November 15, 2003, to a Brazilian father and a Filipino mother. She was born and raised in Rio de Janeiro, Brazil and moved to the Philippines in 2016 to pursue a modeling career. In 2021, de Moura competed in the sixth season of the multi-platform reality series Supermodel Me, where she placed second to Nguyễn Quỳnh Anh of Vietnam.

== Filmography ==
Year	Title	Role	Network	Notes	Ref.
2021	Supermodel Me (season 6)	Herself / Contestant	AXN Asia, iQIYI	Runner-up	

== Pageantry ==
Year	Pageant	Notes	Ref.
2019	Miss Teen Philippines	Winner	
2023	Miss Grand Philippines	Winner	
2023	Miss Grand International	Unplaced	

Awards and achievements
Preceded by Roberta Tamondong (San Pablo, Laguna)	Miss Grand Philippines; 2023	Succeeded by CJ Opiaza (Castillejos, Zambales)
Preceded by Nicole Magadia (Antipolo, Rizal)	Miss Teen Philippines; 2019	Succeeded by Incumbent
Preceded by (Japan) Gabriela Leonardo	Supermodel Me – 1st Runner-up; 2021	Succeeded by (South Korea) Dabi Lee
