= Miss Jalisco =

State-level contest in Jalisco, Mexico

- Formation: 2016
- Type: Beauty Pageant
- Headquarters: Guadalajara
- Location: Mexico
- Local Coordinator: Joel Trujillo

Miss Jalisco is a state-level contest in the state of Jalisco, Mexico, which selects the state representative for the national contest Miss México, thus aspiring to represent the country internationally on one of the platforms offered.

The state organization has achieved the following results since 2016:

- Winner: 1 (2023)
- 1st Runner-up: 1 (2025)
- Top 5/6: 1 (2018)
- Unplaced: 3 (2016, 2017, 2019, 2021)

== National queens ==
- Angie Melchum - Miss Supranational México 2025

== Titleholders ==
The following are the names of the annual winners of Miss Jalisco, listed in ascending order, as well as their results during the national Miss México pageant. State queens who represented the country in a current or past franchise of the national organization are also highlighted in a specific color.

=== Current franchises ===
- Competed at Miss World.
- Competed at Miss Supranational.
- Competed at Miss Cosmo.
- Competed at Miss Elite.
- Competed at Top Model of the World.
- Competed at Reina Internacional del Café.
- Competed at Reina Mundial del Banano.
- Competed at Miss Continentes Unidos.
- Competed at Miss Global City.

=== Former franchises ===
- Competed at Miss Grand International.
- Competed at Miss Costa Maya International.

Year	Titleholder	Hometown	Placement	Special Award	Notes
2026	TBA				
2025	Isabel Sarahí Zamora Soria	Guadalajara	Miss México Supranational	Miss Top Model	Will compete at Miss Supranational 2027
2024	Due to changes in the dates of the national pageant, the election of the state queens was postponed for this year.				
2023	María Fernanda López Hernández	Guadalajara	Top 16	-	5th Runner-up at Top Model of the World 2025; Miss México Top Model of the World 2025; Top 3 at Miss México Top Model of the World 2024
2022	Due to changes in the dates of the national pageant, the election of the state queens was postponed for this year.				
2021	Valeria Martínez de la Cruz	Jalostotitlán	-	-	Top 10 at Miss México Supranational 2023
2020	Due to the contingency of COVID-19 there was a lag in the year of the state contest				
2019	Mariana Macías Ornelas	Chapala	Miss México Grand	Miss Beach Beauty	Will compete at Miss Universe México 2026; Miss Universe Michoacán 2026; 4th Runner-up at Miss Universe México 2024; Miss Universe Michoacán 2024; Top Model of the World 2023; Miss México Top Model of the World 2023; Competed at Miss Grand International 2021; 2nd Runner-up at Embajadora del Mariachi y la Charrería 2015
2018	Tania Aleciram Morales Becerra	Ixtlahuacán	Top 16	-	World Miss University México 2016; Top 5 at Nuestra Belleza Jalisco 2026
2017	Lezly Viridiana Díaz Pérez	Guadalajara	Miss México Grand	Miss Beach Beauty; Head to Head	Top 10 at Miss Grand International 2018; Embajadora del Mariachi y la Charrería 2016
2016	Yoana Gutiérrez Vázquez	San Miguel el Alto	Top 5	-	2nd Runner-up at Miss Universe México 2025; Miss Universe Jalisco 2025; Top 20 at Miss Grand International 2017; Miss México Grand 2017; Señorita Turismo Región de los Altos 2013; Señorita San Miguel el Alto 2012

== See also ==
- Mexicana Universal Jalisco
