= Miss Universe Mexico 2024 =

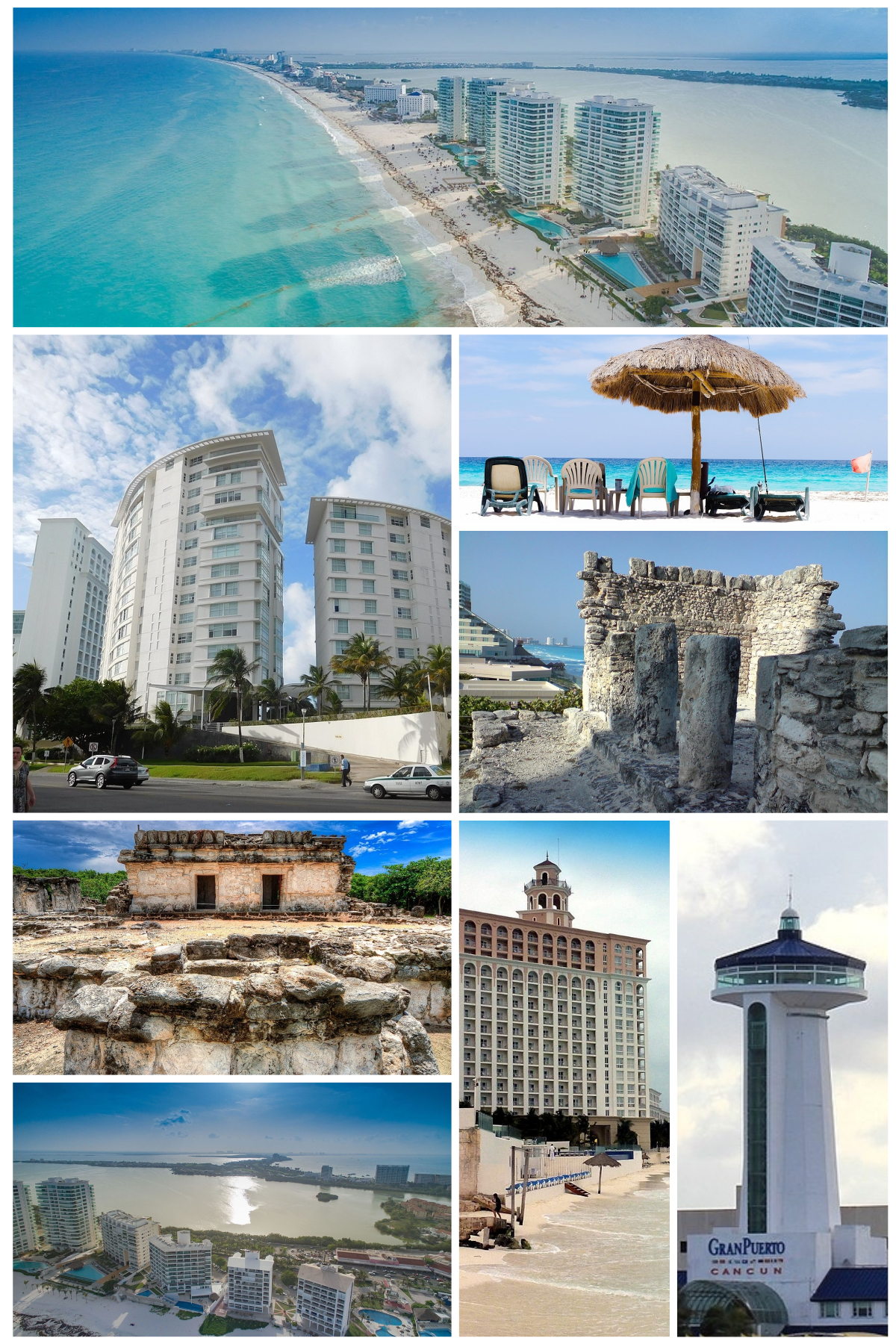
- Cancún, host city of Miss Universe Mexico 2024
- Date: 7 September 2024
- Venue: Centro de Convenciones
- Broadcaster: YouTube
- Entrants: 33
- Placements: Cancún
- Winner: María Fernanda Beltrán; TBA

Miss Universe Mexico 2024 was the inaugural edition of the Miss Universe Mexico national Beauty pageant, created following changes in the administration of the Miss Universe franchise in Mexico. The establishment of the pageant marked a restructuring of the national selection process to choose Mexico’s representative for the Miss Universe competition. Contestants from across the country were expected to participate for the national title, with the winner earning the right to represent Mexico at Miss Universe 2024.
