= Natália Guimarães =

Brazilian actress (born 1984)

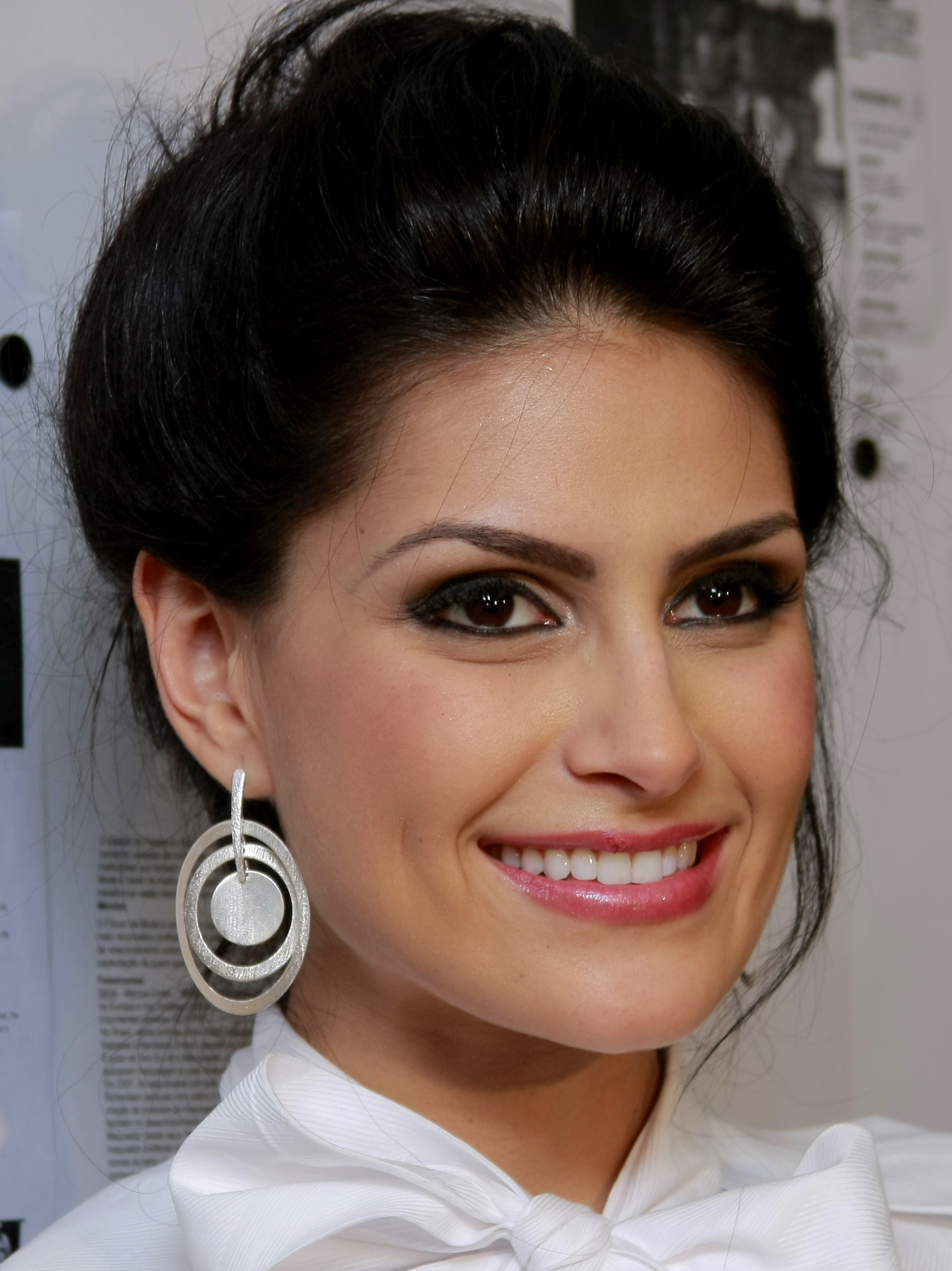
- Born: Natália Aparecida Guimarães; 25 December 1984 (age 41); Juiz de Fora, Minas Gerais, Brazil
- Occupations: Actress; TV host; Model; beauty pageant titleholder
- Height: 1.75 m (5 ft 9 in)
- Partner: Leandro Scornavacca
- Children: 2
- Beauty pageant titleholder
- Title: Top Model of The World 2006 (Resigned); Miss Minas Gerais 2007; Miss Brasil 2007
- Hair color: Brown
- Eye color: Black
- Major competitions: Top Model of The World 2006 (Winner; Resigned); Miss Minas Gerais 2007 (Winner); Miss Brasil 2007 (Winner); Miss Universe 2007 (1st Runner-Up)

Natália Aparecida Guimarães (born 25 December 1984 in Juiz de Fora) is a Brazilian actress, tv host, model and beauty pageant titleholder who won the title of Miss Brasil 2007 and represented her country at Miss Universe 2007 where she placed 1st Runner-up.

== Early life ==
Due to being born on Christmas, natal in Portuguese, Guimarães' parents named her Natália. According to her parents, the choice of her second name is a tribute to Our Lady of Aparecida. She took a package of medals of the saint and use one of its as amulet at Miss Universe 2007 competition activities and telecast program.

Natália was born with six fingers on her hands. She inherited a genetic characteristic called polydactyly from her father, a congenital physical anomaly in humans; these supernumerary fingers or toes do not cause any problems to the carriers. The characteristic was discovered by media reports.

Prior to her current career, Natália had an audition for actress in Rede Globo's telenovela Estrela Guia, but her father forbade it in favor of modeling activities. Guimarães enrolled on the PUC-MG to study architecture, leaving after six semesters to focus on her pageants.

== Pageantry ==
Guimarães, who began her modeling career at 15 years old and previously worked for Ford Models, also won the 2006 Top Model of the World international pageant. However, she resigned due to her participation in Miss Universe 2007 and her runner up from the Philippines assumed the title.

=== Miss Brasil 2007 ===
Guimarães represented the state of Minas Gerais at Miss Brasil 2007 where she beat out 26 other contestants from the states and the Federal District of Brazil, gaining the right to represent her country at Miss Universe 2007.

=== Miss Universe 2007 ===
On 28 May 2007, Guimarães represented Brazil at Miss Universe 2007 held in Mexico City, Mexico where she vied to succeed Zuleyka Rivera of Puerto Rico and eventually finished as 1st runner-Up to Riyo Mori of Japan.

The day after the Miss Universe competition, a Mexican television show asked the public who should have won the pageant. Guimarães won this poll with almost a third of the votes.

== Life after Miss Universe ==
On 13 July, Natália attended the opening ceremony of the Pan American Games in Rio de Janeiro with Brazilian delegation and held the national flag at the occasion. The Miss Brasil titleholder also participated of reality TV Dança no Gelo ("Ice Dance", an ice skating version of Dancing with the Stars) on TV show Domingão do Faustão. Natália also recorded a special guest appearance at soap opera from Rede Bandeirantes, Dance Dance Dance. The episode with the beauty queen was broadcast on 12 November 2007 in Brazil and USA (locally by Band Internacional). She was also invited to be a Victoria's Secret model.

In February 2008, Natália appeared as the Queen for samba school Unidos de Vila Isabel in the Carnival parade in Rio de Janeiro, Brazil. Later, she garnered a first important role in a telenovela, as Ariadne in Caminhos do Coração and in its sequel, Os Mutantes: Caminhos do Coração, both aired on Rede Record.

In 2009, Natália portrayed a minor role in Bela, a Feia, Record-Televisa partnership Brazilian version based upon Mexican La Fea Mas Bella. On this telenovela, Natália's character was found dead on a beach.

Since January 2010, Natália is host of Belo Horizonte's segment of national morning newsmagazine Hoje em Dia. Due to this, she started studying journalism at Pontifical Catholic University of Minas Gerais, graduating in 2015.

On 8 August 2013, Guimarães and longtime boyfriend Leandro Scornavacca of KLB fame welcomed twin daughters Maya and Kiara.

== Television acts and works ==
Year	Title	Role	Notes
2007	Dance, Dance, Dance	Herself (Natália Guimarães)	Guest Appearance
2007	Caminhos do Coração	Ariadne Oliveira (Mulher Aranha)	Supporting
2008	Os Mutantes - Caminhos do Coração	Ariadne Oliveira (Mulher Aranha)	Supporting
2009	A Lei e o Crime	Gisele	Supporting
2009	Bela, a Feia	Mariana	Supporting
2010–present	Hoje em Dia	Host	Hosts the show segment from Belo Horizonte.

== Pageantry winnings and placements ==
Titles
Pageant	Venue	Year	Notes
Miss Minas Gerais	Belo Horizonte	2006	Winner
Top Model of the World	China	2006	Winner (Resigned)
Miss Brasil 2007	Rio de Janeiro	2007	Winner
Miss Universe 2007	México City	2007	1st Runner-Up

Awards and achievements
Preceded by (Japan) Kurara Chibana	Miss Universe 1st Runner-Up; 2007	Succeeded by (Colombia) Taliana Vargas
Preceded by (Rio Grande do Sul) Rafaela Zanella	Miss Universo Brasil; 2007	Succeeded by (Rio Grande do Sul) Natálya Anderle
Preceded by Marcela Duarte	Miss Minas Gerais; 2007	Succeeded by Marina Oliveira Marques
Preceded by (Venezuela) Dominika van Santen	Top Model of the World (Resigned); 2007	Succeeded by (Philippines) Michelle de Leon (Successor)
