= Fátima Bosch =

Mexican model and pageant titleholder (born 2000)

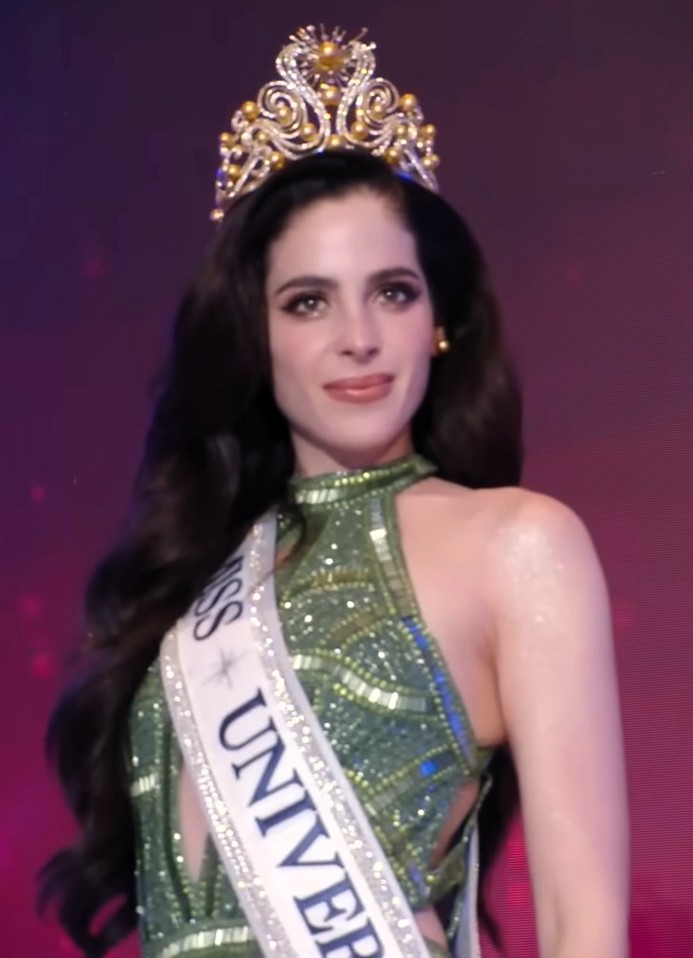
- Bosch in 2025
- Born: Fátima Bosch Fernández; 19 May 2000 (age 26); Teapa, Tabasco, Mexico
- Education: Universidad Iberoamericana
- Height: 1.74 m (5 ft 9 in)
- Beauty pageant titleholder
- Title: Flor Tabasco 2018; Miss Universe Tabasco 2025; Miss Universe Mexico 2025; Miss Universe 2025
- Major competitions: Miss Universe Mexico 2025; (Winner); Miss Universe 2025; (Winner)

Fátima Bosch Fernández (/ˈfætɪmə ˈbɒsk/ FAT-im-ə BOSK; Spanish pronunciation: [ˈfatima ˈβoʃ]; (Note: Despite the common Spanish pronunciation of [ˈboʃ], her surname is originally pronounced [ˈbɔsk] in Catalan.) born 19 May 2000) is a Mexican model and beauty queen who won Miss Universe 2025. She had previously won Miss Universe Mexico 2025. Bosch is the fourth Mexican woman to win Miss Universe.

== Early life and education ==
Fátima Bosch Fernández was born on 19 May 2000, in Teapa, Tabasco, to Bernardo Bosch Hernández and Vanessa Fernández Balboa. Bosch completed her elementary and high school education between Colegio Arji, Instituto Cumbres Villahermosa.

From 2021 to 2024, Bosch attended the Universidad Iberoamericana in Mexico City, where she completed bachelor's degree in fashion and apparel design. Her surname, Bosch, is of Catalan origin and means 'forest'.

== Pageantry ==
=== Flor Tabasco 2018 ===
Bosch won Flor Tabasco, representing Teapa, competed against 16 contestants during the pageant finale held in the Centro de Convenciones Tabasco 2000 of Villahermosa on 25 April 2018. She was crowned by the outgoing titleholder, Bárbara Aranguren.

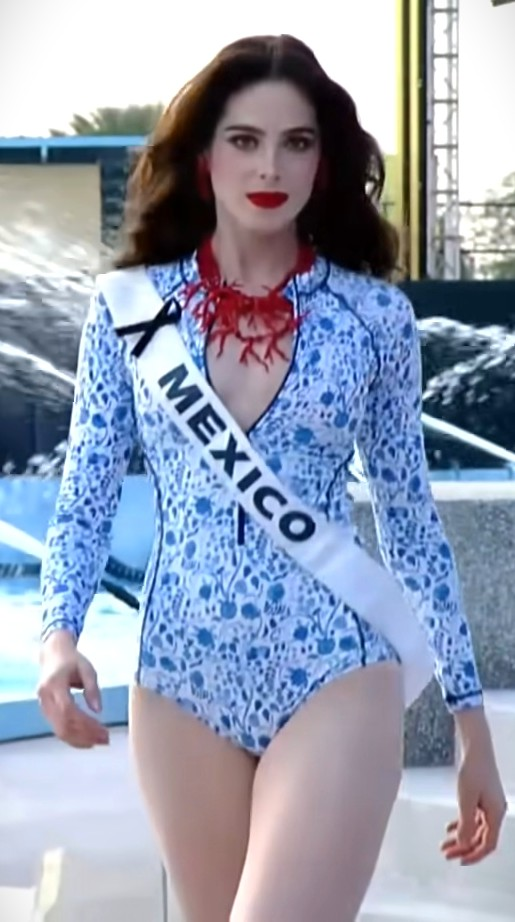
Bosch as Miss Universe Mexico 2025

=== Miss Universe Mexico 2025 ===
Bosch represented Tabasco, and won Miss Universe Mexico 2025, against 31 contestants. The contest held on 13 September 2025, at the Sala Plácido Domingo del Conjunto Santander de Artes Escénicas in Zapopan, Jalisco. She was crowned by the outgoing titleholder María Fernanda Beltrán.

=== Miss Universe 2025 ===
On 4 November 2025, during the sash ceremony event, a dispute occurred when Miss Universe Thailand national director Nawat Itsaragrisil reprimanded Bosch and referred to her as "dumb", leading to tensions and several contestants walking out. Bosch later said she felt disrespected, while Miss Universe 2024, Victoria Kjær Theilvig criticized the public scolding and left the venue.

During the preliminary competition on 19 November 2025, Bosch's fellow contestant Gabrielle Henry, Miss Universe Jamaica 2025, fell through an unguarded opening in the stage floor during the evening gown round and was hospitalised in intensive care in Bangkok. Speaking to Good Morning America following her coronation, Bosch described the stage conditions the contestants had faced during the preliminary rounds, stating that the lighting made it impossible for those walking to see the stage: "The lights that came to us make everything darker, like you can see us, but we couldn't see." When Henry later published a personal statement about her recovery, Bosch was among the fellow contestants who responded publicly, praising Henry's strength and resilience.

On 21 November 2025, Bosch represented Mexico and won Miss Universe 2025, competing against 120 other candidates at the Impact Challenger Hall in Pak Kret, Nonthaburi, Thailand. Bosch is the fourth Mexican woman to earn the Miss Universe title, after Lupita Jones, Ximena Navarrete and Andrea Meza.

Her winning of the Miss Universe 2025 has been at the centre of controversy as three judges pulled out citing irregularities. The documentary, Crown of Deceit: Inside the Miss Universe Scandal documents the circumstances surrounding Bosch’s Miss Universe title.

== Notes ==
Awards and achievements
Preceded by Victoria Kjær Theilvig	Miss Universe; 2025	Incumbent
Preceded by (Sinaloa) María Fernanda Beltrán	Miss Universe Mexico; 2025	Succeeded by (Jalisco) María Vargas
Preceded by Aranza Molina	Miss Universe Tabasco; 2025	Succeeded by Ximena Aranda
Preceded by Bárbara Aranguren	Flor Tabasco; 2018	Succeeded by Valeria Chablé
