= Miss Universe Mexico 2025 =

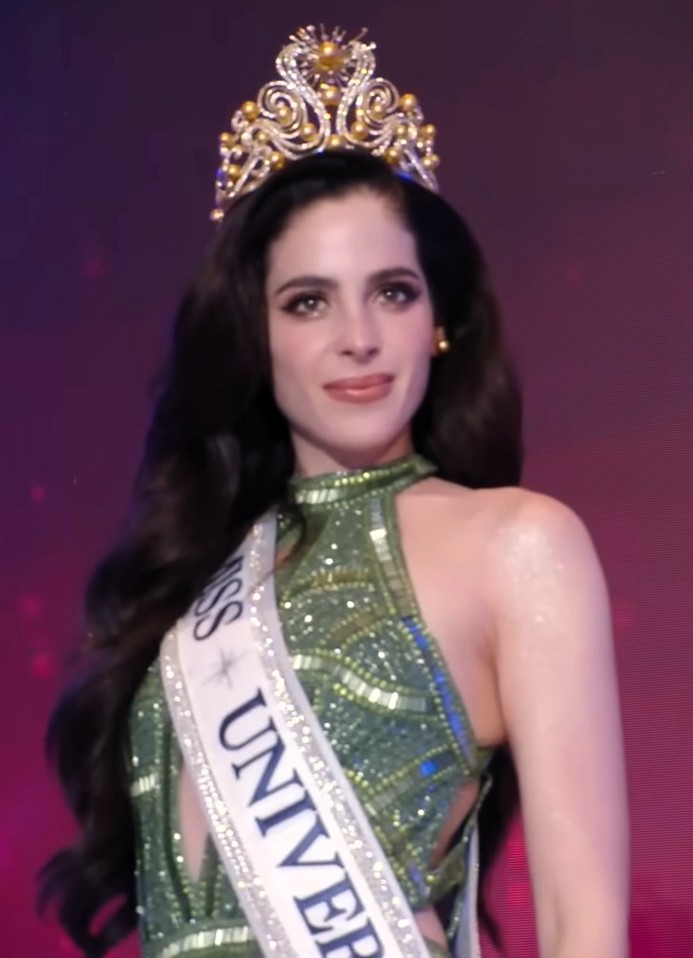
- Fatima Bosch
- Date: 13 September 2025
- Entertainment: Melody
- Venue: Plácido Domingo Hall of the Santander Performing Arts Complex, Zapopan, Jalisco, México
- Broadcaster: Imagen Televisión
- Entrants: 32
- Placements: 16
- Winner: Fátima Bosch; Tabasco

‌Miss Universe Mexico 2025 was the 2nd edition of the Miss Universe Mexico pageant, held at the Sala Plácido Domingo of the Conjunto Santander de Artes Escénicas in the city of Zapopan, Jalisco, on Saturday, 13 September 2025. Thirty-two contestants competed for the title.

María Fernanda Beltrán of Sinaloa crowned Fátima Bosch of Tabasco as Miss Universe Mexico at the end of the event. This marked Tabasco's first victory in the pageant. Bosch represented Mexico at Miss Universe 2025, where she was crowned the winner.

== Results ==
=== Placements ===
Color keys

- The contestant won in an international pageant.
- The contestant was a runner-up in an international pageant.
- The contestant was a semi-finalist in an international pageant.
- Unplaced

Placement	Contestant	International placement
Miss Universe Mexico 2025	Tabasco – Fátima Bosch	Winner – Miss Universe 2025
1st Runner-Up	Nuevo León – Fernanda Vázquez ∞	
2nd Runner-Up	Jalisco – Yoana Gutiérrez	
3rd Runner-Up	Nayarit – Ana Ramíres	
4th Runner-Up	San Luis Potosí – Alejandra Díaz de León	
Top 10	Aguascalientes - Linda Gallegos; Michoacán – Fedra Alpes; Puebla – Camila Canto; Sonora – Celeste Hidalgo; Veracruz - Fernanda Pumar §	
Top 16	Baja California – Leslie Meza; Quintana Roo – Michelle Domínguez; Sinaloa – Sol Gutiérrez; Tamaulipas – Lorena López; Tlaxcala – Elena Roldán; Yucatán – Emiré Arellano	

^§Automatically qualified as a semifinalist after winning the "popular vote"

^∞Bosch won Miss Universe 2025. Due to protocol, Bosch relinquished her title and the 1st runner-up, Fernanda Vázquez, assumed the Miss Universe Mexico title.

== Contestants ==
Thirty-two contestants competed for the title.

Locality	Contestant	Age (Note: Ages at the time of the competition)	Hometown	Notes
Aguascalientes	Linda Hermosillo Gallegos	24	Calvillo	
Baja California	Leslie Alejandra González Meza	28	Tijuana	
Baja California Sur	Isabel Chávez	24	La Paz	
Campeche	Litzy Nayomi Subías Espinoza	23	Guadalupe y Calvo	
Chiapas	Fernanda Castro	31		
Chihuahua	Priscila Grado Quiñónez	27	Chihuahua	
Coahuila	Karen Ferreira Martínez	25	Cuatrociénegas	
Colima	Marcela Corona Verduzco	24	Tecomán	
Durango	Valeria Antuna Cuevas	22	Durango	
Guanajuato	Yesenia Macías Atilano	33	Guadalajara	
Guerrero	Isabel Aurora Ruiz Gómez	24	Acapulco	
Hidalgo	Fernanda Castillo	31	Puebla	
Jalisco	Yoana Gutiérrez Vázquez	30	San Miguel el Alto	
Mexico City	Ana Karen Cervantes Zolorio	—	Mexico City	
Michoacán	Fedra “Alpes” Alondra Pérez Solís	26	Ciudad Hidalgo	
Morelos	Ana Sofía Velázquez Jiménez	26	Tepic	
Nayarit	Ana Rosario Ramírez Murillo	27	Santiago Ixcuintla	
Nuevo León	María Fernanda Vázquez Villalobos	22	Atotonilco	
Oaxaca	Vanessa Ponce Orozco	—	San Ignacio Cerro Gordo	
Puebla	Camila Canto Vera	24	Puebla	
Querétaro	Begoña Oviedo Guadarrama	27	Salamanca	
Quintana Roo	Michelle Domínguez	28	Cancún	
San Luis Potosí	Alejandra Díaz de León Soler	25	San Luis Potosí	
Sinaloa	Marisol “Sol” Gutiérrez Félix	22	Ahome	
Sonora	Celeste Hidalgo Lizárraga	27	San Luis Rio Colorado	
State of Mexico	Aylin Rubí Barajas Rebollar	26	Mexico City	
Tabasco	Fátima Bosch	25	Teapa	
Tamaulipas	Lorena Edith López Pulido	28	Reynosa	
Tlaxcala	María Elena Roldán Gutiérrez	30	Chiautempan	
Veracruz	Fernanda “Pumar” Gómez Ramos	24	Veracruz	
Yucatán	Emiré Arellano Escalante	29	Mérida	
Zacatecas	María Guadalupe Ramírez Delgado	24	Fresnillo	
