= Miss Universe Mexico =

National beauty pageant in Mexico

- Type: Women's beauty pageant
- Franchise holder: George Figueroa
- Headquarters: Mexico City, Mexico
- Country represented: Mexico
- Qualifies for: Miss Universe
- First edition: 2024
- Most recent edition: 2026
- Current titleholder: María Vargas; Jalisco
- Language: Spanish

Miss Universe Mexico is a national beauty pageant that selects Mexico's official representative to Miss Universe—one of the Big Four International beauty pageants.

The current Miss Universe Mexico is María Vargas of Jalisco who was crowned on August 29, 2026, in Cabo San Lucas, Baja California Sur.

== History ==
From 1994 to 2023, the Mexicana Universal organization (formerly Nuestra Belleza México) held the national franchise for Miss Universe. The organization, led by Miss Universe 1991 Lupita Jones, was responsible for selecting the Mexican representative to compete in the Miss Universe pageant. In December 2023, it was announced that Jones lost her national license because she opposed the new rules allowing the inclusion of married women and mothers in the pageant.

On November 20, the official announcement of the new organization “Miss Universe Mexico” was made, with former Nuestra Belleza Nuevo León 2010 Cynthia de la Vega appointed as the national director of the pageant. However, in May 2024, De la Vega was removed as national director. The position was then assumed by Martha Cristiana, a Mexican actress and beauty pageant titleholder. A month later, Cristiana publicly announced her resignation as national director during a press conference. George Figueroa assumed the position of national director.

== Editions ==
Edition	Date	Presenters	Venue	Entrants	Ref.
1st	September 7, 2024	Jacqueline Bracamontes, Carlos Adyan.	Centro de Convenciones, Cancún, Quintana Roo.	33	
2nd	September 13, 2025	Jacqueline Bracamontes, Mauricio Mancera.	Sala Plácido Domingo del Conjunto Santander de Artes Escénicas, Zapopan, Jalisco.	32	
3rd	August 29, 2026	Clovis Nienow	Corazón Cabo Resort & Spa, Cabo San Lucas, Baja California Sur	32	

The following is a list of all Miss Universe Mexico titleholders and runners-up.

Year	Miss Universe Mexico	Finalists				Ref.
Year	Miss Universe Mexico	1st Runner-up	2nd Runner-up	3rd Runner-up	4th Runner-up	Ref.
2024	María Fernanda Beltrán Figueroa	Aranza Anaid Molina Rueda	Ana Karen Bustos González	Lorena Marlene Sevilla Mesina	Mariana Macías Ornelas	
2025	Fátima Bosch Fernández	María Fernanda Vázquez Villalobos	Yoana Gutiérrez Vázquez	Ana Rosario Ramírez Murillo	Alejandra Díaz de León Soler	
2026	María Guadalupe Vargas Naranjo	Mariana Macías Ornelas	María Fernanda Abaroa	Génesis Vera Fernández	Ximena Torres Ochoa	

== Titleholders ==
=== Miss Universe Mexico 2024 — Present ===
Year	Miss Universe Mexico	State	Competition performance		Ref.
Year	Miss Universe Mexico	State	Placement at Miss Universe	Special award(s)	Ref.
2024	María Fernanda Beltrán Figueroa	Sinaloa	2nd Runner-Up		
2025	Fátima Bosch Fernández	Tabasco	Miss Universe 2025		
2026	María Guadalupe Vargas Naranjo	Jalisco			

=== Winners Gallery ===
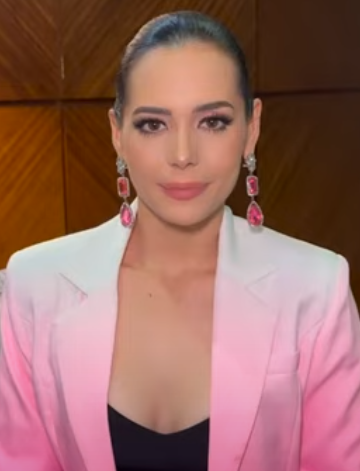
Miss Universe Mexico 2024
María Fernanda Beltrán, Sinaloa

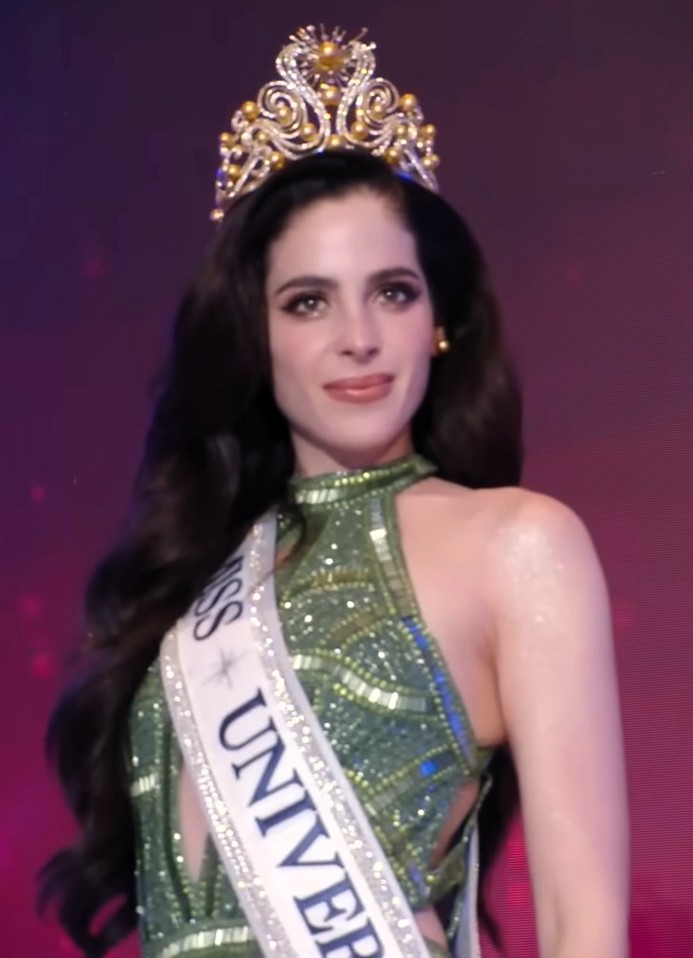
Miss Universe Mexico 2025
Fátima Bosch, Tabasco

== See also ==
- Señorita México
- Mexicana Universal
- Miss Mexico Organization
- Miss Earth México
- Mister México
