= Kosmina =

Kosmina is a surname. It is gender-neutral in Slovenia. In Russia, Ukraine, and Belarus, it is most often the feminine form of Kosmin.

- Elena Kosmina (born 1995), Ukrainian beauty pageant titleholder
- Janko Kosmina (born 1935), Slovene sailor
- John Kosmina (born 1956), Australian football player and manager
- Mitja Kosmina (born 1966), Slovene sailor
- Natalia Kosmina (born 1982), Ukrainian para table tennis player
