= Miss Grand Mexico 2023 =

1st Miss Grand Mexico competition, beauty pageant edition

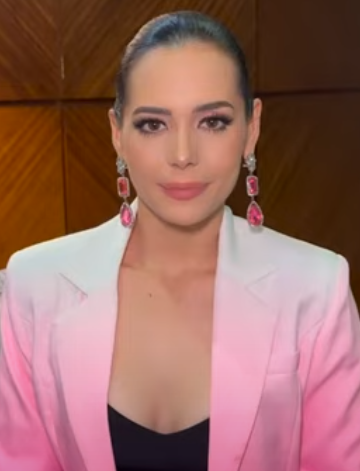
- Fernanda Beltrán, the winner of the contest
- Date: 30 August 2023
- Presenters: Stephanie Silva; Gustavo Rosas
- Entertainment: Arturo Ortega
- Venue: Modular Inés Arredondo (MIA), Culiacán, Sinaloa
- Broadcaster: YouTube
- Entrants: 5
- Placements: 5
- Debuts: Coahuila; Jalisco; Puebla; Sinaloa; United States
- Winner: Fernanda Beltrán (Sinaloa)

Miss Grand Mexico 2023 competition result by state
Color key:
Winner	1st RU	2nd RU
3rd RU	4th RU	Withdrew
No representative		RU = Runner-up

Miss Grand Mexico 2023 was the inaugural edition of the Miss Grand Mexico pageant, held on 30 August 2023, at the Modular Inés Arredondo (MIA), Culiacán, Sinaloa. Five candidates competed for the title, of whom a 23-year-old marketing and communication student representing the state of Sinaloa, Fernanda Beltrán, was announced the winner. Meanwhile, the remaining candidates were named runners-up. Beltrán was crowned by Miss Grand Mexico 2022, Laysha Salazar, and represented the country at the Miss Grand International 2023 pageant, in Vietnam on October 25. She did not place in the top 20.

The contest was directed by a Venezuelan businessperson, Flavio Falsiroli, and its grand final coronation round was hosted by Stephanie Silva and Gustavo Rosas.

== Background ==
After acquiring the license of Miss Grand Mexico in 2022, Flavio Falsiroli, along with another pageant organizer, Orlando Ruiz, planned to organize a national pageant named Concurso Nacional de Belleza de México (CNB México) in 2023 to select the country representative for Miss Grand International 2023, but the proposition was later canceled due to some internal conflicts, which caused Falsiroli to establish his own pageant, Miss Grand Mexico, as the replacement contest. He also franchised the state competitions to individual local organizers, who would name thirty-two state titleholders to compete in the national pageant; only nine state licenses were distributed, while the titleholders of the remaining 23 states were determined through a national grand casting held on June 3, 2023, at the Emporio Reforma Hotel in Mexico City.

Initially, the national final contest was set to be held in September in Chihuahua's northern border city, Ciudad Juárez, following the request of Iliana Conny Blanco, the 2023 state director of Miss Grand Chihuahua, who claimed that the event was approved and fully supported by the local government as well as several local business sectors. However, on July 20, Blanco informed the national organizer that she was unable to comply with the aforementioned agreement due to a lack of local government and financial support, which caused the event to be relocated to Culiacán, Sinaloa.

In this inaugural edition, only one state-level preliminary contest was held, as detailed below.

Pageant	Edition	Date and venue	Entrants	Ref.
Miss Grand Sinaloa	1st	August 30, 2023, at Modular Inés Arredondo (MIA), Culiacan, Sinaloa	5	

== Result ==
Position	Delegate
Miss Grand Mexico 2023	Sinaloa – Fernanda Beltrán
1st runner-up	(United States) Mexico USA – Aarlin Bustamante
2nd runner-up	Coahuila – Frida Reynoso
3rd runner-up	Jalisco – Priscila Franco
4th runner-up	Puebla – Ingrid Lucero

== Candidates ==
Initially, nine candidates confirmed their participation, but four of them, including the representatives of Chihuahua, Nuevo León, Tabasco, and Zacatecas, withdrew from the competition, making the finalized total of five contestants.

- Coahuila – Frida Reynoso
- Jalisco – Priscila Franco
- USA Mexican Community in USA – Aarlin Bustamante
- Puebla – Ingrid Lucero
- Sinaloa – Fernanda Beltrán
- Chihuahua – Abril Amaya (withdrew)
- Nuevo León – Areli Hernández (withdrew)
- Tabasco – Karla Jiménez Milla (withdrew)
- Zacatecas – Elena Roldán Gutiérrez (withdrew)
