= Miss Grand Mexico =

Mexican beauty pageant title

- Pageant logo for 2022–2023
- Formation: 2013
- Type: Beauty pageant
- Headquarters: Mexico City
- Location: Mexico
- Members: Miss Grand International
- Official language: Spanish
- National Director: María Guadalupe "Lupita" Jones Garay
- Parent organization: Mexicana Universal (2024 – incumbent)

Miss Grand Mexico
licensees timeline

Stand-alone pageant
Under other pageants
Appointed titleholder
No licensee/titleholder

Miss Grand Mexico is a national title bestowed upon a woman chosen to represent Mexico at the international pageant, headquartered in Bangkok, Thailand. The title was first mentioned in 2013 when Jesús Rábago, the director of a Mexican national pageant, Rostro de México, appointed his 2012 contest winner, Laura Alvarez, to represent the country in the inaugural edition of the parent international contest, Miss Grand International 2013, in Thailand. The license was transferred to Miss Mexico Organization in 2017, and then to Flavio Falsiroli in 2022. Since December 2023, the new franchise holder is former Miss Universe 1991, Mexico's own Lupita Jones, who will crown next year's official candidate during her national pageant of Mexicana Universal, sometime in 2024.

Mexico has competed in all 13 editions of Miss Grand International, with their highest placement being in 2019 where María Malo finished as the first runner-up. In addition, Mexico has won the Best Evening Gown award three times: 2020, 2022, and 2025.

The current Miss Grand Mexico is Montserrat Villalva from Hidalgo. She finished as the 5th runner-up at Miss Grand International 2025 in Thailand.

== History ==
Since the establishment of Miss Grand International in 2013, Mexico has always sent its representatives to compete at such every year. In the first four years, the country representatives were either handpicked or determined through a national pageant organized by Jesús Rábago, Rostro de México. In 2017, Hugo Castellanos took over the franchise and the representatives were instead elected through another national pageant, Miss Mexico, until Castellanos lost the franchise to Flavio Falsiroli in 2022.

Under the direction of Flavio Falsiroli, his first affiliated titleholder, Jessica Farjat, was appointed. The following representatives were expected to be elected through a national contest directed by Orlando Ruiz, Concurso Nacional de Belleza de México (CNB México). However, some internal conflicts caused Orlando Ruiz to vacate the team and Farjat also resigned from the title. Falsiroli then held an ad hoc audition to select a new representative; more than 20 applications were received, and a 19-year-old girl from Hermosillo, Laysha Salazar, was elected the winner. Falsiroli organized the inaugural edition of the Miss Grand Mexico pageant in August 2023. However, Falsiroli relinquished the franchise the following year.

As of December 2023, the current national franchise holder is former Miss Universe 1991, Lupita Jones, who will select the official candidate for the 2024 pageant during the Mexicana Universal national pageant.

== Editions ==
The following is the detail of the Miss Grand Mexico edition, which was held as a stand-alone pageant only once in 2023.

=== Date and venue ===
Edition	Date	Final Venue	Host state	Entrants	Ref.
1st	30 August 2023	Modular Inés Arredondo (MIA), Culiacán	Sinaloa	10	

=== Competition result ===
Year	Edition	Winner	1st runner-up	2nd runner-up	3rd runner-up	4th runner-up	Ref.
2023	1st	Fernanda Beltrán (Sinaloa)	Aarlin Bustamante (MEX in the US)	Frida Reynoso (Coahuila)	Priscila Franco (Jalisco)	Ingrid Lucero (Puebla )	

== International Competition ==
The following is a list of Mexican representatives at the Miss Grand International contest.

Year	Delegate	National title	Competition performance		National Director	Ref.
Year	Delegate	National title	Placements	Other awards	National Director	Ref.
2013	Laura Álvarez	Rostro de México 2012	Unplaced	—	Jesús Rábago	
2014	Marsha Ramírez	Rostro de México 2013	Top 20	—	Jesús Rábago	
2015	Aracely Azar	Rostro de México 2014	Top 20	—	Jesús Rábago	
2016	Paulina Flores	Rostro de México 2015	Top 20	—	Jesús Rábago	
2017	Yoana Gutiérrez	Miss Mexico 2016 — Top 5	Top 20	—	Hugo Castellanos	
2018	Lezly Díaz	Miss Grand Mexico 2018	Top 10	—	Hugo Castellanos	
2019	María Malo	Miss Grand Mexico 2019	1st Runner-up	—	Hugo Castellanos	
2020	Ángela Yuriar	Miss Mexico 2019 — Top 10	Top 20	Best Evening Gown	Hugo Castellanos	
2021	Mariana Macías	Miss Grand Mexico 2021	Unplaced	—	Hugo Castellanos	
2022	Jessica Farjat	Appointed	Resigned		Flavio Falsiroli	
2022	Laysha Salazar	Miss Grand Mexico 2022	Top 20	Best Evening Gown	Flavio Falsiroli	
2023	Fernanda Beltrán	Miss Grand Mexico 2023	Unplaced	—	Flavio Falsiroli	
2024	Tania Estrada	Mexicana Universal 2023 — Top 5	Top 20	—	Lupita Jones	
2025	Montserrat Villalva	Miss Grand Mexico 2025	5th Runner-up	Best Evening Gown	Lupita Jones	
2026	Pety Juárez	Miss Grand Mexico 2026	5th Runner-up		Lupita Jones	
Color keys for the Placements at Miss Grand International Declared as the winner Ended as a runner-up (Top 5) Ended as a finalist (Top 10) Ended as a semifinalist (Top 20/21)

== Winners Gallery ==
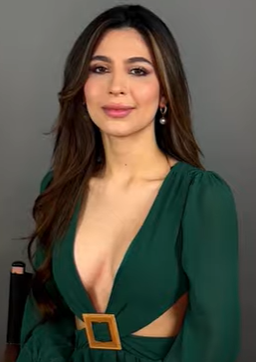
Miss Grand Mexico 2022
Laysha Salazar

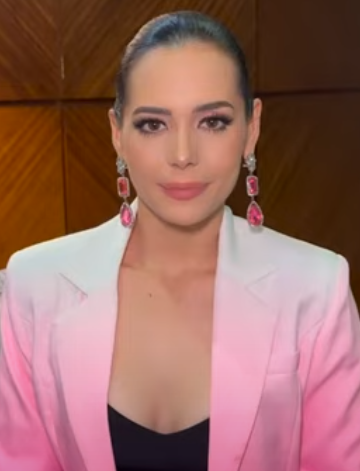
Miss Grand Mexico 2023
Fernanda Beltrán

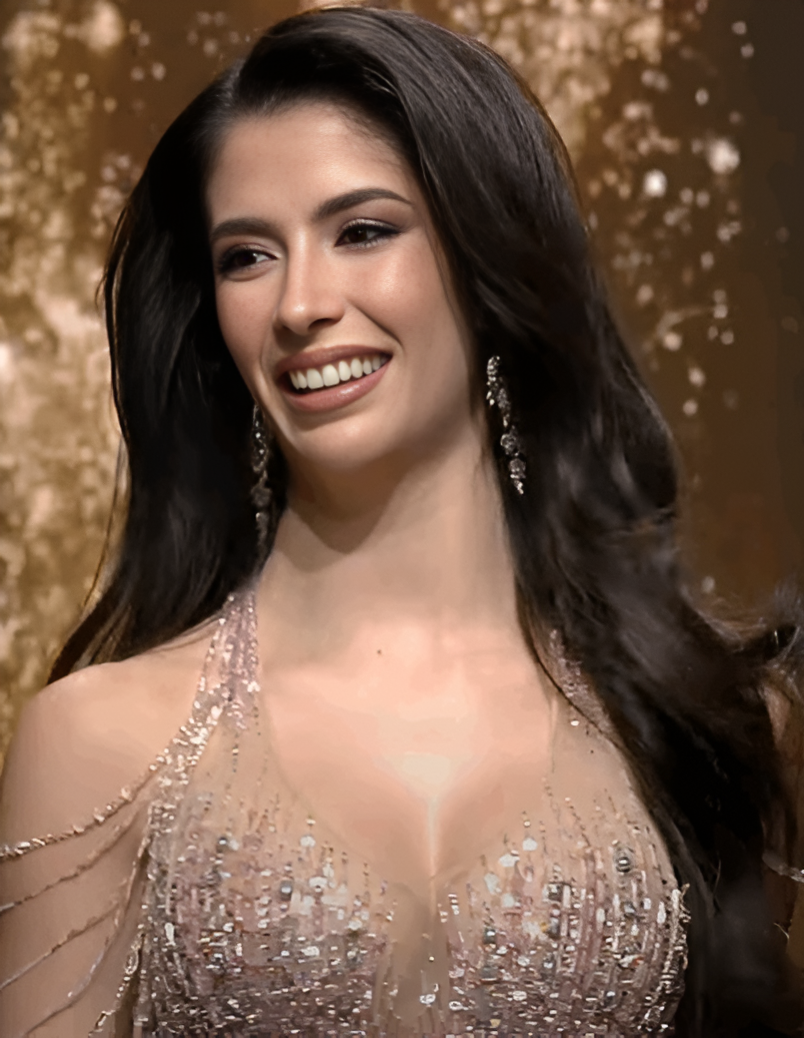
Miss Grand Mexico 2024
Tania Estrada

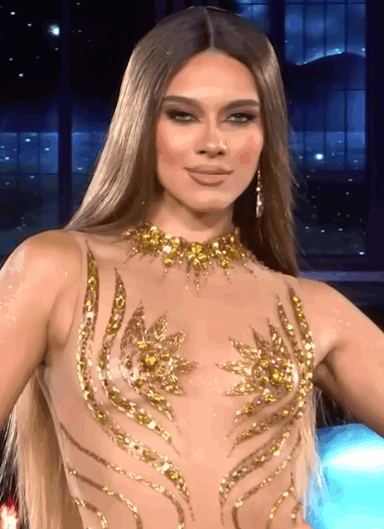
Miss Grand Mexico 2025
Montserrat Villalva
