= Tania Estrada =

Mexican TV host and beauty pageant titleholder (born 1995)

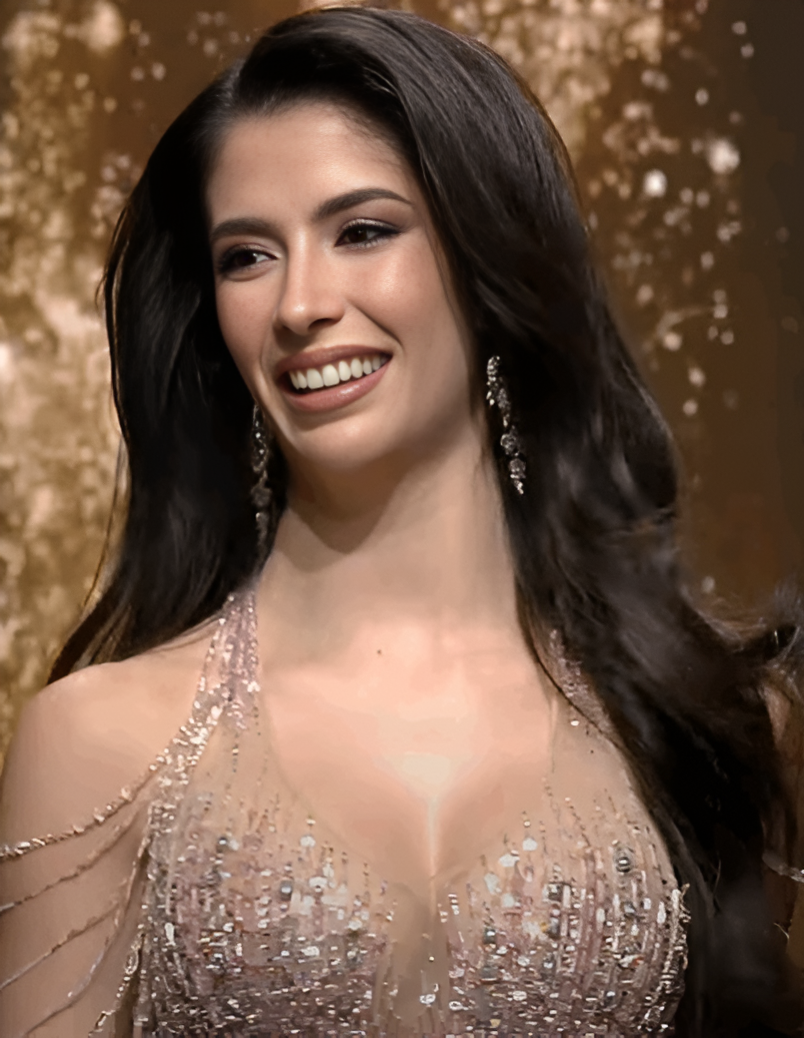
- Born: Tania Estrada Quezada; November 20, 1995 (age 30); Vicente Guerrero, Chihuahua, Mexico
- Education: Autonomous University of Chihuahua
- Occupations: Model; TV host
- Height: 1.70 m (5 ft 7 in)
- Title: Miss Grand Mexico 2024

Tania Estrada Quezada is a Mexican television host, model and beauty pageant titleholder. She represented Mexico at Miss Grand International 2024 held in Thailand, and reached the top 20.

== Early life and education ==
Estrada was born on November 20, 1995, in Guerrero, Chihuahua. She graduated from the Autonomous University of Chihuahua with a degree in Centro de Educación Artística for Arts Education.

She currently works as a presenter for Televisa's Foro TV news channel in Mexico City, and in 2022 was the tourism ambassador for the Ah Chihuahua campaign, promoting the state of Chihuahua.

== Pageantry ==
Estrada represented state of Chihuahua at Mexicana Universal 2023, held at the Convention and Exhibition Center in Aguascalientes. At the end of the event, Estrada was crowned Mexicana Charm Universal 2023 by her predecessor Karen Bustos.

She was announced as Miss Grand Mexico on August 28, 2024. Estrada represented Mexico at Miss Grand International 2024 held in MGI Hall in Bangkok, Thailand and reached the top 20.

Awards and achievements
| Preceded by (Sinaloa) Fernanda Beltrán | Miss Grand Mexico; 2024 | Succeeded by (Hidalgo (state)) Montserrat Villalva |
| Preceded by Janeth Loya | Mexicana Universal Chihuahua; 2023 | Succeeded by Emma Campoya |
