= Sarah Coventry =

American jewelry brand

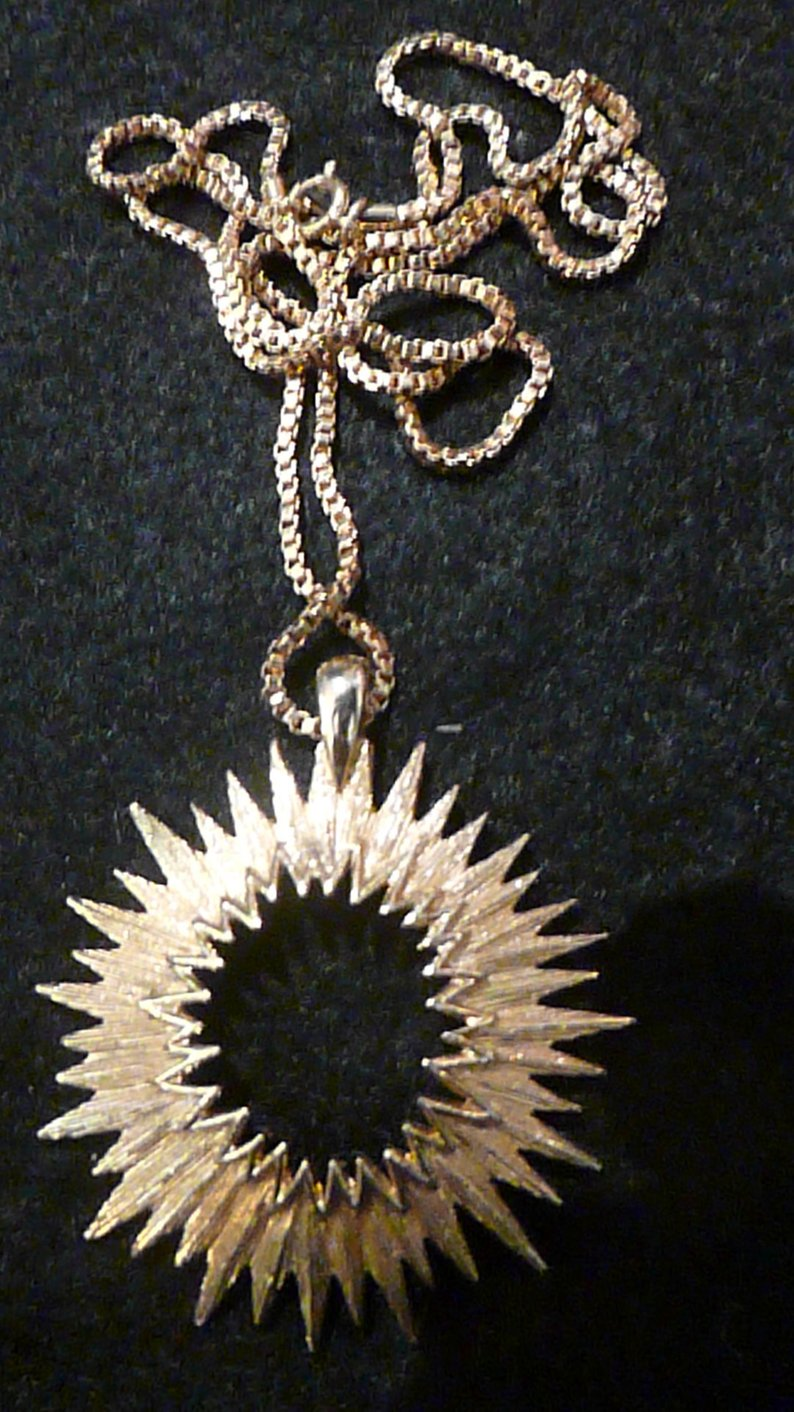
- Sarah Coventry 1976 "Outer Space" pendant
- Industry: Costume jewelry
- Founded: 1949; 77 years ago
- Founder: Lyman K. Stuart
- Fate: Bankruptcy in 1981

Sarah Coventry was an American costume jewelry brand based in Newark, New York. The company was named after the granddaughter of Lyman K. Stuart, the founder.

Established in 1949, the sales force was at first all male. Thousands of women and some men were recruited to sell jewelry at Sarah Coventry home jewelry parties. It was recognized as the largest direct selling jewelry company in the world during the sixties and early seventies. However by 2009, the name Sarah Coventry was fully no longer in business.

== Production ==
The company did not manufacture their own jewelry. Instead, they sketched out designs and then used other manufacturers to produce it. S&M Enameling Company, based in Providence, Rhode Island, produced jewelry for Sarah Coventry for 20 years. Most of the production happened in the state of Rhode Island.

From 1949-1985, Sarah Coventry used a space built by Reed Manufacturing in Newark, New York for jewelry production. In 2024, the factory was named on the New York Register of Historic Places.

Jewelry pieces were made with a variety of materials: gold-colored metal, rhodium, plastic, rhinestones, and gemstones.

== Bankruptcy ==
In 1981, Sarah Coventry filed for bankruptcy.

The trademarked name passed through several hands. In the mid-1980s a subsidiary of Playboy Enterprises, Inc. (the publishers of Playboy magazine) owned the company, as it was planning on diversifying into a brand management company. It later sold the company in the 1990s.

Sarah Coventry jewelry was re-opened years later by new owners and was distributed by representatives via catalogs, the internet, home shopping networks, and other means. By 2009, the name Sarah Coventry was no longer in business.

== Marks ==
Throughout its history, Sarah Coventry utilized a number of different maker's marks to identify its pieces. Early jewelry was unsigned through 1955, but from 1956 onward, various marks became standard. In the 1960s and 1970s, these marks were often accompanied by a copyright symbol. Some special collections featured unique marks, such as "Sarah Cov Sterling" or "Lord Coventry". The marks were typically located on the back of brooches, clasps, or on hang tags, which occasionally included motifs such as butterflies or hand mirrors. The evolution of these marks helps collectors date and authenticate original Sarah Coventry pieces.

Common marks found on vintage Sarah Coventry jewelry include:

- "SC"
- "Sarah Cov."
- "Sarah"
- "SaC"
- "Coventry"

== Gallery ==
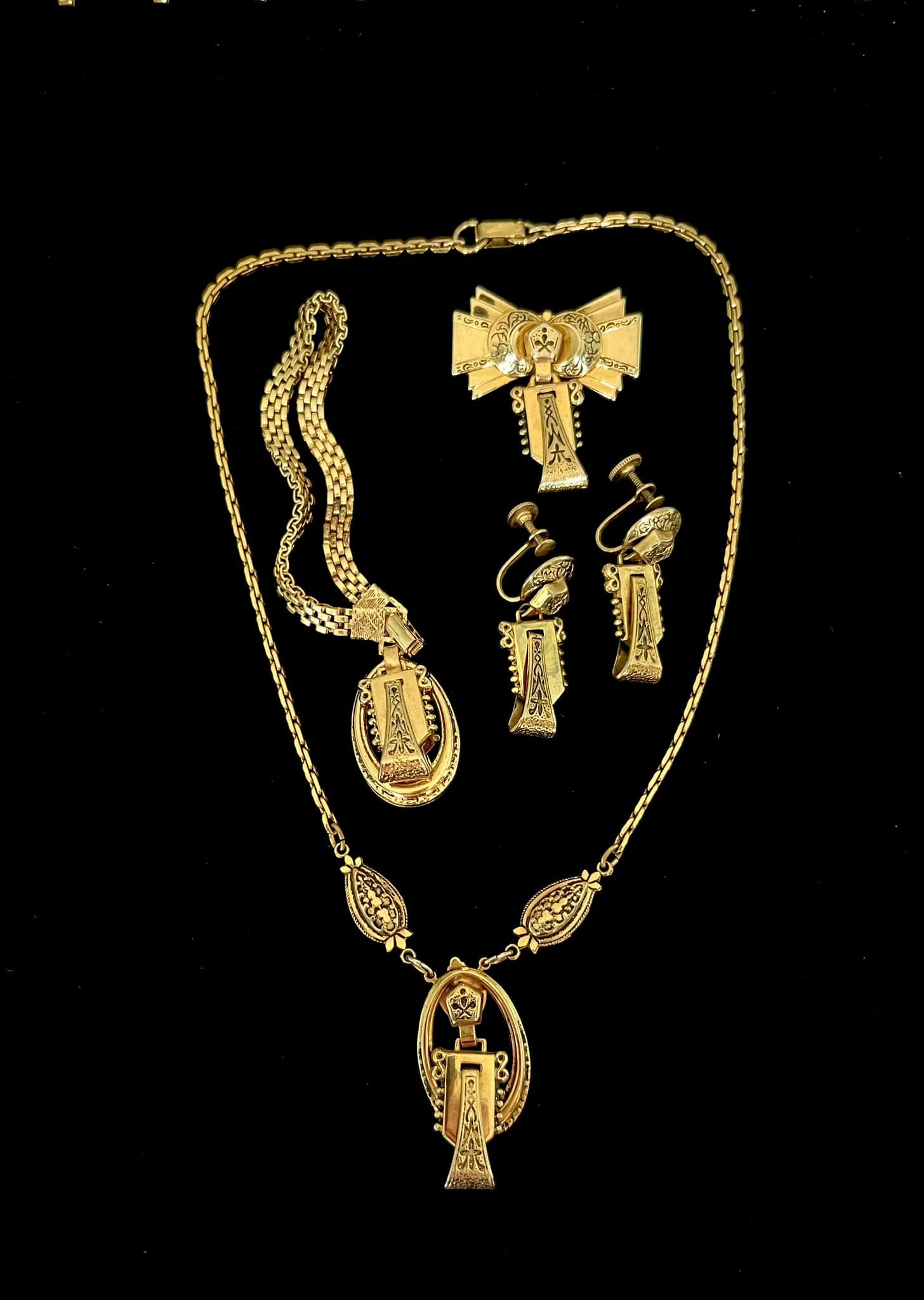
1949 Unsigned "Victorian Charm"

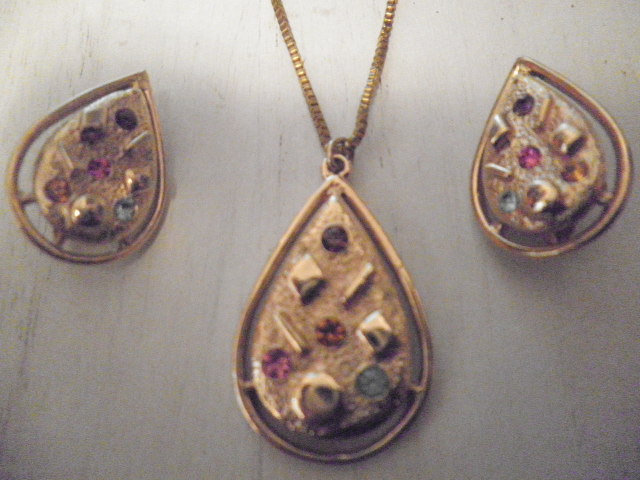
1959 "Sultana" necklace

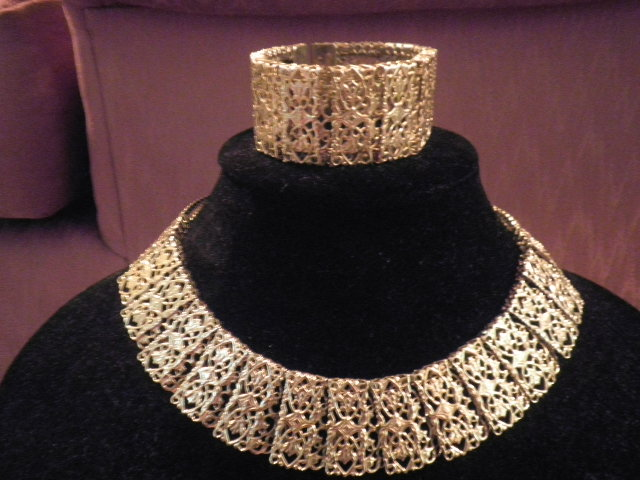
1961 "Chantilly Lace" necklace

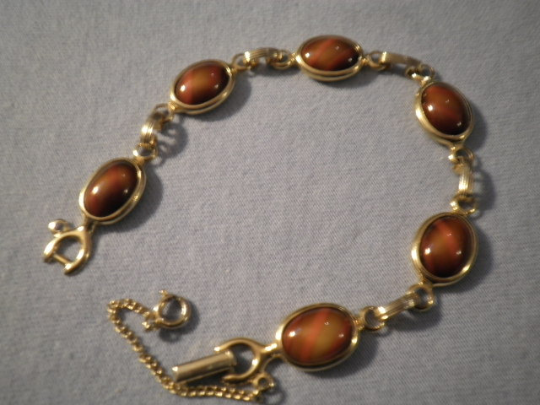
1970 "Wood Nymph" bracelet

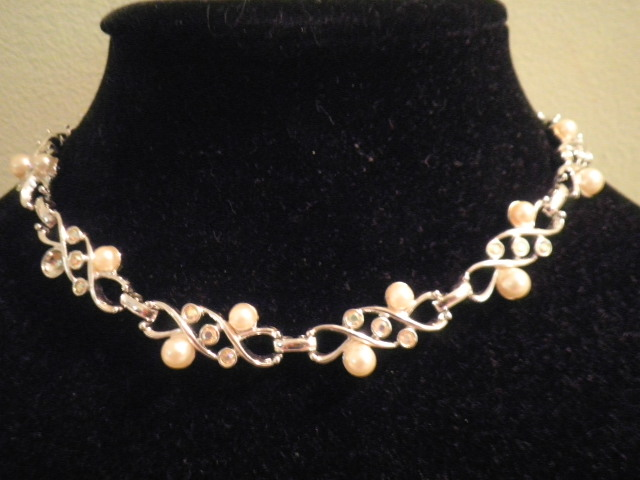
1958 "Moonlight Serenade" necklace

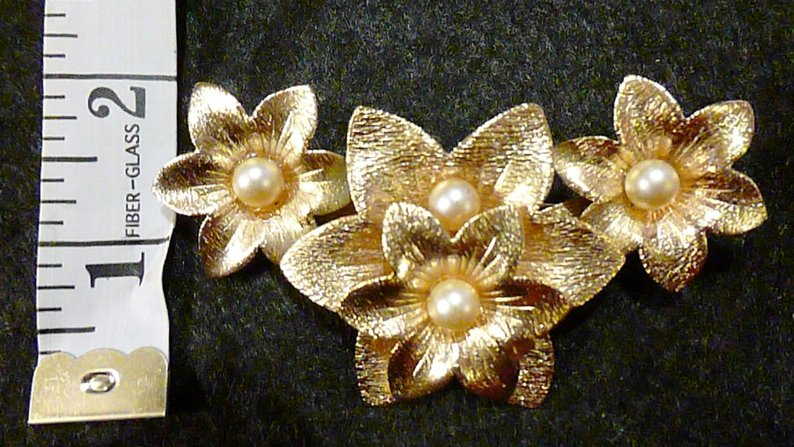
1962 "Lotus Blossom" brooch

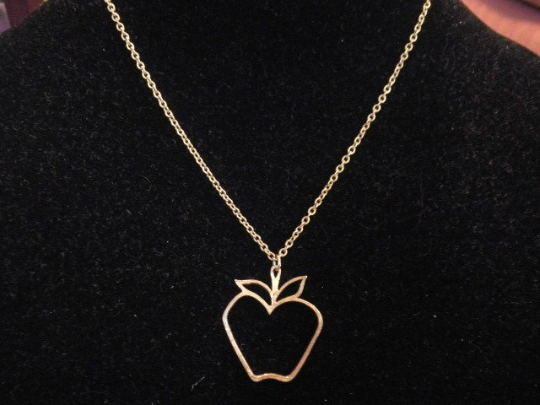
1976 "The Big Apple" pendant
