= Elena Kosmina =

Ukrainian model

- Елена Космина
- Born: Alona Stanislavovna Kosmina; March 31, 1995 (age 30); Poltava, Ukraine
- Occupation: model
- Modeling information
- Height: 1.75 m (5 ft 9 in)
- Hair color: Brown
- Eye color: Green
- Agency: Aston model- LA, Thomas Zeumer management- NYC/Paris, "Elite Models" - Ukraine, "Prestige Models" -Ukraine, "4 Models" - Ukraine, "Merilyn" -Ukraine, "Time Models" - Zurich

Elena Kosmina (Ukrainian: Елена Космина; born March 31, 1995) is a Ukrainian model and beauty pageant titleholder who won the title of Top Model of the World 2015. She has modeled for commercial advertising campaigns and editorial photo shoots, known for her appearance in the international model pageant Top Model of the World 2015 and was crowned as Top Model of Ukraine.

== Career ==
At the age of 13, she started attending model school and graduated in three years. At the age of 16, she started participating in local beauty contests where was discovered by model agent from Elite Models Yana Stavitskay. In 2013, she was invited to the Black Sea Top Model contest where she became one of Top 10 best models. In August 2015, she was selected among 25 Ukrainian models as a Top Model of Ukraine by TMW and was sent as a model to represent her country on the international level. On September 4, at Top Model of the World 2015 in El Gouna, Egypt, she became a best model on the international level among top 50 most models all over the world.
