= Dominika van Santen =

Venezuelan actress and model

- Born: 15 July 1983 (age 41); Maracaibo, Venezuela
- Beauty pageant titleholder
- Title: Miss Península Guajira; Miss Venezuela (2005); Top Model of the World (2005)

Dominika van Santen (born 15 July 1983) is a Venezuelan actress and model.

== Career ==
At the age of 16, Van Santen commenced her modeling career. When her father saw an article in the newspaper regarding a beauty contestant, he insisted that Dominika enter the contest. She won the competition.

After the beauty pageant she was offered numerous modeling gigs with local and international companies. She has appeared on numerous magazine covers in Venezuela and fashion campaigns like Gallo in Guatemala.

Van Santen was selected to represent Margarita Island at Top Model of the World 2005 held in Humen, China. She was the second Venezuelan to win the competition, after Jacqueline Aguilera in 1995.

She started her acting career in 2010.
