= Crown of Deceit: Inside the Miss Universe Scandal =

American documentary series

- Genre: Documentary
- Country of origin: United States
- Original language: English
- No. of episodes: 3

Original release
- Network: TLC
- Release: November 12, 2026

Crown of Deceit: Inside the Miss Universe Scandal is a 2026 American documentary series. It premiered on TLC on November 11, 2026.

== Premise ==
Follows the history and controversies of the Miss Universe organization including Miss USA

== Episodes ==
No.	Title	Original release date
1	"I Am Silenced"	November 12, 2026
2	"Were We Groomed?"	November 12, 2026
3	"It's Not a Beauty Contest...It's a Cartel"	November 12, 2026
