= Top Model of the World =

Beauty competition

- Formation: 1993; 33 years ago
- Type: Beauty pageant
- Headquarters: Panama City
- Location: Panama
- Members: WBO
- Official language: English
- Website: www.topmodeloftheworld.com

Top Model of the World is an international beauty pageant that focuses on finding the ultimate model. It was founded in 1993 in Miami, organized by the Globana Group, and is now owned and managed by the World Beauty Organization.

== Winners ==
Year	Country/Territory	Top Model of the World	Official venue	Entrants
2026	Katherine Castano	Colombia	Sahl Hasheesh, Egypt	34
2025	Natalia Garizabal Vera	Colombia	Hurghada, Egypt	44
2024	Maria Katren Varzaru	Romania	Ain Sokhna, Egypt	38
2023	Mariana Macías	Mexico	Sharm El Sheikh, Egypt	41
2022	Natalie Kocendova	Czech Republic	Hurghada, Egypt	47
2020	Pierinna Patino	Peru	Hurghada, Egypt	35
2019	Nicole Menayo	Spain	Hurghada, Egypt	35
2018	Janet Leyva	Peru	Hurghada, Egypt	41
2017	Julya Gershun	Ukraine	El Gouna, Egypt	41
2016	Margo Cooper	Bulgaria	Bremen, Germany	41
2015	Elena Kosmina	Ukraine	Red Sea, Egypt	49
2014	Tania Valencia	Colombia	Red Sea, Egypt	41
2013	Monica Palacios	Caribbean	Red Sea, Egypt	47
2012	Luna Voce	Italy	Dortmund, Germany	43
2011	Loredana Salanță	Romania	Usedom, Germany	44
2009	Nina Rodríguez	Colombia	Dortmund, Germany	40
2008	Débora Lyra	Brazil	Berlin, Germany	41
2007	Alessandra Alores	Germany	Hurghada, Egypt	41
2006	Michelle de Leon (Assumed)	Philippines	Kunming, China	64
2006	Natália Guimarães (Resigned)	Brazil	Kunming, China	64
2005	Dominika van Santen	Margarita Island	Humen Town, China	68
2004	Sun Na	China	Karlsruhe, Germany	34
2003	Nihan Akkuş	Turkey	Aachen, Germany	38
2002	Natascha Börger	Germany	Aachen, Germany	33
2001	Renata Janetkova	Czech Republic	Kaiserslautern, Germany	28
2000	Yeliz Çalışkan	Turkey	Vreden, Germany	30
1999	Suzana Fabriova	Slovak Republic	Frankfurt, Germany	unknown
1998	Michelle Khan	Trinidad and Tobago	Magdeburg, Germany	28
1997	Franzisca Schaub	Germany	Legden, Germany	45
1996	Selinée Méndez	Dominican Republic	Koblenz, Germany	26
1995	Jacqueline Aguilera	Venezuela	Moscow, Russia	36
1994	Yelena Boyarinova	Russia	Miami, United States	24
1993	Francesca Bologna	Italy	Miami, United States	unknown

- Natália Guimarães, winner of the 2006 edition, resigned her title as she represented Brazil in Miss Universe 2007. She was replaced by Michele de Leon (Philippines) and 1st runner-up.

=== By number of wins ===
Country/Territory	Titles	Winning years
Colombia	4	2009, 2014, 2025, 2026
Germany	3	1997, 2002, 2007
Romania	2	2011, 2024
Peru	2	2018, 2020
Italy	2	1993, 2011
Turkey	2	2000, 2003
Mexico	1	2023
Czech Republic	1	2022
Spain	1	2019
Bulgaria	1	2016
Ukraine	1	2015
Caribbean	1	2013
Brazil	1	2008
Philippines	1	2006
Margarita Island	1	2005
China	1	2004
Czech Republic	1	2001
Slovak Republic	1	1999
Trinidad and Tobago	1	1998
Dominican Republic	1	1996
Venezuela	1	1995
Russia	1	1994

=== Continents by number of wins ===
Country/Territory	Titles	Years
Europe	14	1993, 1997, 1999, 2001, 2002, 2007, 2011, 2012, 2015, 2016, 2017, 2019, 2022, 2024
Americas	12	1995, 1996, 1998, 2005, 2008, 2009, 2013, 2014, 2018, 2020, 2023, 2025
Asia	5	1994, 2000, 2003, 2004, 2006
Africa	0	

== List of Runners-up ==
Year	1st Runner-up	2nd Runner-up	3rd Runner-up	4th Runner-up
1994	Yelena "Lena" Boyarinova; Russia	Pinar Tezcan; Turkey	not awarded	
1995	Paula Andrea Betancourt; Colombia	Leen Ragis; Kenya	not awarded	
1996	Jana Festova; Czech Republic	Andrea Deak; Hungary	Anja Haertel; Germany	Vierushka Algandona Viera; Panama
1997	Cris Tomaszeck; Brazil	not awarded		
1998	Tanisha Drummond; Panama	Agnes Nagy; Hungary	Dania Prince Méndez; Honduras	Jonna Kauppila; Finland
1999	Monica Escolar Danko; Colombia	Dayanarah Roozendaal; Curaçao	not awarded	
2000	Nina Kavecevic; Yugoslavia	Jerika Hoffman Leal; Venezuela	not awarded	
2001	Jenny Díaz Batista; Dominican Republic	Mónica Caicedo Valencia; Colombia	Zornitsa Hristova; Bulgaria	Basak Sahin; Turkey
2002	Nikki Formann; United States	Kristina Tudikova; Slovak Republic	Adanelli Nuñez; Mexico	Justine Vinluan Gabionza; Philippines
2003	Daniela Scholz; Germany	Huan Lulu; China	Desirée Virginia Pallotta Peña; Venezuela	Lorena Irene Velarde Briceño; Mexico
2004	Yordanos Teshager Bitew; East Africa (Ethiopia)	Mirjana Gmitrovic; Serbia and Montenegro	Viktoria Stadtlander; Germany	Irina Stikanova; Estonia
2005	Maria Joseph Kidumbuyo; Tanzania	Katarzyna Blazko; Poland	not awarded	
2006	Michelle de Leon; Philippines	Tatyana Dmitrivenko; Kazakhstan	not awarded	
2007	Yelena Aladko; Belarus	Lobna Amin; Egypt	not awarded	
2008	Yolimar Sánchez; United States	Diana Ivancheva; Bulgaria	not awarded	
2010	Gabriela Nidioska Concepción Guzmán; Venezuela	Muriel Susana Viera; United States	Xenia Lamber; Ukraine	Daniela Arkenberg; Germany
2011	Katerina Fedosejeva; Baltic Sea (Latvia)	Vanessa Gayle Sibanda; Zimbabwe	Zuzanna Brzezińska; Poland	Yasmine Ouchene; Algeria
2012	Malaika Maidei Mushandu; Zimbabwe	Melina Ramirez Serna; Colombia	Maria de Luz Da Silva dos Santos; Denmark	Maria de Luz Da Silva dos Santos; Venezuela
2013	Inara Anthonia Isaiah; Guinea	Burcu Taynaz; Turkey	Savanagh-Ray Walker; Canada	Ganna Oleksiyivna Zhadan; Ukraine
2014	Jailenne Rivera Rodríguez; Puerto Rico	Anrónet Ann Roelofsz; South Africa	Niler Bernard Mruma; Tanzania	Giulia Campesi; Italy
2015	Celeste Marshall; Bahamas	Irene Valeria Velásquez; Venezuela	Stephany Souza Silva; Brazil	Madison Anderson Berrios; Puerto Rico
2016	Franceska Marisabel Toro Medina; Puerto Rico	Paththage Visna Kaumini Fernando; Sri Lanka	Emanuelle de Maria Costa Assunção; Brazil	Anchana Artklom; Thailand
2017	María Camila Medrano Camargo; San Andrés (Colombia)	Norhely Celaya Bracamontes; Mexico	not awarded	
2018	Harini Silva; Sri Lanka	Natalia La Torre Santana; Puerto Rico	not awarded	
2019	Vishakha Tania René; Mauritius	Carmen Sofia Maury Atencia; Colombia	not awarded	
2020	Priscila Moreno Valverde; Mexico	Giselle Archbold Davis; Colombia	not awarded	
2022	Nicole Zambrano; Ecuador	Dayana Cardenas; Colombia	not awarded	
2023	Leicy Rivas Moreno; Colombia	Sandani Peiris; Sri Lanka	not awarded	
2024	Geysel Vaillant; Cuba	Sarah Sherwood; United States	not awarded	
2025	Lorena Suárez; Cuba	Hanā Warissaya; Thailand	not awarded	
2026	Angelis Sánchez; Puerto Rico	Eunice Deza; Philippines	not awarded	

== See also ==
- Miss Model of the World
- Best Model of Turkey
