= Miss México 2021 =

- Date: July 1, 2021
- Presenters: Lezly Díaz; Yoana Gutiérrez
- Venue: Salón Lago Di Como by Castalia, Chihuahua City, Chihuahua, Mexico
- Broadcaster: Livestream (Facebook)
- Entrants: 32
- Placements: 16
- Withdrawals: Aguascalientes
- Winner: Karolina Vidales Valdovinos; Michoacán

Miss México 2021 was the fourth edition of the Miss México pageant and it was held on Thursday, July 1, 2021, at the Salón Lago Di Como by Castalia in Chihuahua City, Chihuahua, Mexico. Last year's winner, Ashley Alvídrez Estrada of Chihuahua crowned her successor, Karolina Vidales Valdovinos of Michoacán, at the end of the event. Vidales will represent Mexico at Miss World 2021.

== Final results ==
=== Placements ===
Final results	Contestant
Miss Mexico 2021/2020	Michoacán – Karolina Vidales Valdovinos
Miss Mexico Grand 2021	Jalisco – Mariana Macías
1st Runner-Up	Quintana Roo – Regina González
2nd Runner-Up	Oaxaca – Sabrina Góngora
Top 6	Coahuila – Georgina Vargas; Sonora – Ayram Ortíz
Top 10	Colima – Adriana Daniela Ramírez; Nuevo León – Evelyn Álvarez; Tlaxcala – Fedra Pérez; Yucatán – Ana Rivero
Top 16	Baja California – Daniela Flores Pedroza; Baja California Sur – Diana Ramírez; Chiapas – Rocío Carrillo; Ciudad de México – Jéssica Farjat; Puebla – Valerie Bartsch; Veracruz – Andrea Munguía

=== Regional Queens of Beauty ===
Title	Contestant
Miss Mexico Northwest	Sonora – Ayram Ortíz
Miss Mexico West	–
Miss Mexico Center	Tlaxcala – Fedra Pérez
Miss Mexico Northeast	Coahuila – Georgina Vargas
Miss Mexico Southeast	Quintana Roo – Regina González

=== Special awards ===
Award	Contestant
Best State Costume	Quintana Roo – Regina González
Catwalk Challenge	Chiapas – Rocío Carrillo
English Challenge Winner	Puebla – Valerie Bartsch
History of Mexico Contest Winner	Puebla – Valerie Bartsch
Self Makeup Challenge Winner	Sonora – Ayram Ortíz

=== Challenges ===
==== Beauty With a Purpose ====
Final Result	Candidate
Winner	Puebla – Valerie Bertsch
Top 5	Baja California – Daniela Flores Pedroza; Colima – Adriana Daniela Ramírez; Nuevo León – Evelyn Álvarez; San Luis Potosí – Daniela Sánchez
Top 12	Chiapas – Rocío Carrillo; Chihuahua – Isela Serrano; Coahuila – Georgina Vargas; Estado de México – Perla Franco; Guerrero – Isabel Ruíz; Michoacán – Karolina Vidales Valdovinos; Morelos – Fernanda Hutterer

==== Talent ====
Final Result	Candidate
Winner	Yucatán – Ana Rivero
1st Runner-Up	Nuevo León – Evelyn Álvarez
2nd Runner-Up	Estado de México – Perla Franco
Top 13	Chiapas – Rocío Carrillo; Ciudad de México – Jessica Farjat; Colima – Adriana Daniela Ramírez; Puebla – Valerie Bertsch; Querétaro – Valeria Ruíz; Quintana Roo – Regina González; Sinaloa – Elizabeth Vidaña; Sonora – Ayram Ortíz; Tlaxcala – Fedra Pérez; Zacatecas – Karina Román

==== Beach Beauty ====
Final Result	Candidate
Winner	Jalisco – Mariana Macias
1st Runner-Up	Quintana Roo – Regina González
2nd Runner-Up	Sinaloa – Elizabeth Vidaña
Top 13	Baja California Sur – Diana Ramírez; Ciudad de México – Jessica Farjat; Coahuila – Georgina Vargas; Colima – Adriana Daniela Ramírez; Michoacán – Karolina Vidales Valdovinos; Nuevo León – Evelyn Álvarez; Oaxaca – Sabrina Góngora; Querétaro – Valeria Ruíz; San Luis Potosí – Daniela Sánchez; Tlaxcala – Fedra Pérez

==== Top Model ====
Final Result	Candidate
Winner	Oaxaca – Sabrina Góngora
1st Runner-Up	Tlaxcala – Fedra Pérez
2nd Runner-Up	Michoacán – Karolina Vidales Valdovinos
Top 12	Chihuahua – Isela Serrano; Ciudad de México – Jessica Farjat; Estado de México – Perla Franco; Jalisco – Mariana Macias; Quintana Roo – Regina González; Sonora – Ayram Ortíz; Tabasco – Paloma Zurita; Yucatán – Ana Rivero; –

==== Sports ====
Final Result	Candidate
Winner	Nayarit – Lenaura Blessing Chukwu
1st Runner-Up	Hidalgo – Jaqueline Gómez
2nd Runner-Up	Michoacán – Karolina Vidales Valdovinos
Top 8	Baja California – Daniela Flores Pedroza; Estado de México – Perla Franco; Tabasco – Paloma Zurita; Quintana Roo – Regina González; San Luis Potosí – Daniela Sánchez

==== Head to Head Challenge ====
Final Result	Candidate
Winners	Durango – Carolina Thomas; Michoacán – Karolina Vidales Valdovinos
Top 4	Aguascalientes – Ximena Hita; Tlaxcala – Fedra Pérez
Top 8	Baja California – Daniela Flores Pedroza; Nuevo León – Evelyn Álvarez; Sonora – Ayram Ortíz; Yucatán – Ana Rivero
Top 16	Campeche – Jennifer Álvarez; Chiapas – Rocío Carrillo; Coahuila – Georgina Vargas; Estado de México – Perla Franco; Guerrero – Isabel Ruíz; Puebla – Valerie Bertsch; San Luis Potosí – Daniela Sánchez; Zacatecas – Karina Román

==== Dances of México ====
Final Result	Candidate
Top 5/Winners	Campeche – Jennifer Álvarez; Ciudad de México – Jessica Farjat; Colima – Adriana Daniela Ramírez; Sonora – Ayram Ortíz; Veracruz – Andrea Munguía

==== Multimedia ====
Final Result	Candidate
Winner	Chiapas – Rocío Carrillo

==== Self Makeup Challenge ====
Final Result	Candidate
Winner	Sonora – Ayram Ortíz
Top 5	Chihuahua – Isela Serrano; Guerrero – Isabel Ruíz; Michoacán – Karolina Vidales Valdovinos; Sinaloa – Elizabeth Vidaña

== Official Delegates ==
=== Contestants ===
State	Candidate	Age	Height	Hometown
Aguascalientes	Ximena Luna Hita †	21	1.70 m (5 ft 7 in)	Aguascalientes
Baja California	Daniela Flores Pedroza	21	1.72 m (5 ft 7 1/2 in)	Ensenada
Baja California Sur	Diana Patricia Ramírez Lara	26	1.72 m (5 ft 7 1/2 in)	La Paz
Campeche	Jennifer Álvarez Ruiz	26	1.68 m (5 ft 6 in)	Cuba
Chiapas	Rocío Carrillo Flores	23	1.70 m (5 ft 7 in)	Tapachula
Chihuahua	Isela Serrano	22	1.75 m (5 ft 9 in)	Juárez
Ciudad de México	Jéssica Lizet Rodríguez Farjat	25	1.75 m (5 ft 9 in)	Mexico City
Coahuila	Georgina Vargas	27	1.84 m (6 ft 1/2 in)	Saltillo
Colima	Adriana Daniela Ramírez Cruz	26	1.76 m (5 ft 9 1/2 in)	Colima City
Durango	Carolina Nicolle Thomas Echeverría	23	1.73 m (5 ft 8 in)	Durango City
Estado de México	Perla del Consuelo Franco Ayala	23	1.67 m (5 ft 5 1/2 in)	Villa Guerrero
Guanajuato	Georgina Mariana Villanueva Rodríguez	22	1.73 m (5 ft 8 in)	San Miguel de Allende
Guerrero	Isabel Aurora Ruiz Gómez	20	1.72 m (5 ft 7 1/2 in)	Acapulco
Hidalgo	Jaqueline Gómez Cisneros	21	1.83 m (6 ft 0 in)	Tulancingo
Jalisco	Mariana Macías Ornelas	24	1.78 m (5 ft 10 in)	Chapala
Michoacán	Karolina Vidales Valdovinos	24	1.75 m (5 ft 9 in)	Jiquilpan
Morelos	María Fernanda Hutterer Fonseca	22	1.70 m (5 ft 7 in)	Cuernavaca
Nayarit	Lenaura Blessing Chukwu	23	1.70 m (5 ft 7 in)	Tepic
Nuevo León	Evelyn Montserrat Álvarez Armendáriz	25	1.72 m (5 ft 7 1/2 in)	Santa Catarina
Oaxaca	Sabrina Góngora	23	1.72 m (5 ft 7 1/2 in)	Puerto Escondido
Puebla	Valerie Bartsch Aburto	24	1.70 m (5 ft 7 in)	Atlixco
Querétaro	Valeria Ruiz Hernández	22	1.74 m (5 ft 8 1/2 in)	Monterrey
Quintana Roo	Regina González Salman	18	1.70 m (5 ft 7 in)	Guadalajara
San Luis Potosí	Daniela Sánchez Acosta	22	1.75 m (5 ft 9 in)	San Luis Potosí City
Sinaloa	Elizabeth Vidaña Ortiz	25	1.72 m (5 ft 7 1/2 in)	Culiacán
Sonora	Ayram Guadalupe Ortíz Alonso	25	1.72 m (5 ft 7 1/2 in)	Caborca
Tabasco	Paloma Zurita			
Tamaulipas	Naila Navarro Vázquez	22	1.76 m (5 ft 9 1/2 in)	San Fernando
Tlaxcala	Fedra Alondra Pérez Solís	21	1.70 m (5 ft 7 in)	Tlaxcala City
Veracruz	Andrea Munguía Olivares	24	1.68 m (5 ft 6 in)	Minatitlán
Yucatán	Ana Paulina Rivero Hernández	21	1.75 m (5 ft 9 in)	Mérida
Zacatecas	Nadia Karina Román	22	1.76 m (5 ft 9 1/2 in)	Jerez

== Notes ==
=== Replacements ===
- Ciudad de México – Arianny Sarays Tenorio Mejías (Arianny Tenorio) resigned her state title for personal reasons by her own free will. As a result, Jéssica Lizet Rodríguez Farjat (Jessica Farjat) was designated as the new Miss Ciudad de México/Miss Mexico City 2019/2020.
- Morelos – Alejandra Huerta was stripped from the Miss Morelos title on March 9 for breach of contract, so the 1st Runner-Up, Fernanda Hutterer, was crowned as the new Miss Morelos 2019.
- Nayarit – Alejandra Ávila was removed from her title due to lack of commitment and interest. Blessing Chukwu, who was the 1st Runner-Up of the state pageant, was appointed as the new Miss Nayarit 2019.
- San Luis Potosí – Alexa Muñiz resigned from being Miss San Luis Potosí for personal reasons, for which Daniela Sánchez was appointed as the state representative to replace her.
- Tabasco – Gildy Guillermina Reyes Colorado (Gildy Reyes) resigned days prior to the competition for personal reasons, her title was then given to Paloma Zurita, who was contestant at Miss Puebla.

=== Death of Miss Aguascalientes ===
On 1 January 2021, Miss Aguascalientes, Ximena Hita was found lifeless on her apartment. As per investigation, Authorities are suspecting suicide on the cause of her death. There were no replacement for her.
