= María Fernanda Beltrán =

Mexican beauty queen, Miss Universe 2024 runner-up

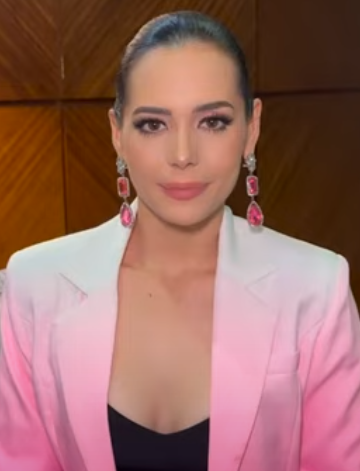
- Beltrán in 2023
- Born: María Fernanda Beltrán Figueroa; 15 February 2000 (age 26); Culiacán, Sinaloa, Mexico
- Height: 1.78 m (5 ft 10 in)
- Beauty pageant titleholder
- Title: Miss Grand Mexico 2023; Miss Universe Mexico 2024
- Major competitions: Miss Grand Mexico 2023; (Winner); Miss Grand International 2023; (Unplaced); Miss Universe Mexico 2024; (Winner); Miss Universe 2024; (2nd Runner-Up)

María Fernanda Beltrán Figueroa is a Mexican model from the state of Sinaloa who won Miss Universe Mexico 2024 on September 7, 2024, in Cancun. She represented Mexico at the Miss Universe 2024 pageant held in Mexico City, where she finished as the second runner-up, becoming the third Mexican to achieve that placement.

== Early life and career ==
Beltrán is a native of Culiacán with a background in beauty pageants and holds an academic degree in marketing and communication. She is fluent in Spanish, English, and French.

== Pageantry ==
Miss Grand Mexico 2023

Beltrán participated in the Miss Grand Mexico 2023 competition held in Modular Inés Arredondo (MIA), representing the state of Sinaloa. At the end of the event, Fernanda was crowned as Miss Grand Mexico 2023. She represented Mexico at the Miss Grand International 2023 competition held in Vietnam.

=== Miss Grand International 2023 ===
As the winner of Miss Grand Mexico, Beltrán represented Mexico at the Miss Grand International 2023 competition held in Phú Thọ Indoor Stadium, Ho Chi Minh City, Vietnam on 25 October. She did not place in the top 20.

=== Miss Universe Mexico 2024 ===
Beltrán, representing Sinaloa, competed alongside 33 contestants at the first edition of Miss Universe Mexico. The final night was held on September 7, 2024 at the Convention Centre in Cancun, Mexico. Beltrán was crowned Miss Universe Mexico 2024 by Miss Universe 2023, Sheynnis Palacios. With this victory, she became Mexico's representative at Miss Universe 2024 in Mexico City.

Miss Universe 2024

As Miss Universe Mexico 2024, Beltrán was the representative of Mexico at the Miss Universe 2024 competition held on home soil in Mexico. The final night was held on November 16, 2024 at Arena CDMX in Mexico City. Finished as the 2nd runner up, behind 1st runner up Chidimma Adetshina of Nigeria and Miss Universe 2024, Victoria Kjær Theilvig of Denmark. With her 2nd runner up finish, Beltrán became the third Mexican to achieve this placement and the highest placement for a representative from Sinaloa representing Mexico at Miss Universe.

Awards and achievements
Preceded by (Australia) Moraya Wilson	Miss Universe 2nd Runner-Up; 2024	Succeeded by (Venezuela) Stephany Abasali
Preceded by (Michoacán) Melissa Flores	Miss Universe Mexico; 2024	Succeeded by (Tabasco) Fátima Bosch
Preceded by (Sonora) Laysha Salazar	Miss Grand Mexico; 2023	Succeeded by (Chihuahua (state)) Tania Estrada
