= Mariana Macías =

Mexican model

- Born: Mariana Macías Ornelas; July 1, 1996 (age 30); Chapala, Jalisco, Mexico
- Occupation: Model
- Height: 1.78 m (5 ft 10 in)
- Beauty pageant titleholder
- Title: Top Model of the World 2023; Miss Grand Mexico 2021
- Major competitions: MGI All Stars 2nd Edition (TBA)

Mariana Macías Ornelas is a Mexican model and beauty queen. She became the first Mexican to win the title of Top Model of the World held in Sharm El Sheikh, Egypt.

== Life and career ==
Macías was born on July 1, 1996 in Chapala, Jalisco. She earned her degree in marketing from the Centro Universitario de Ciencias Económico-Administrativas (CUCEA) of the Universidad de Guadalajara in Guadalajara, Jalisco.

Macías participated in Miss Mexico 2021 representing Jalisco where she was crowned Miss Grand Mexico. Therefore, it was up to her to represent Mexico in the Miss Grand International 2021 in Bangkok, Thailand. At the end of the event, she did not place among the semifinalists.

Two years later, Macías competed once again in the international scene, represented Mexico at Top Model of the World competition held in White Hills Resort, Sharm El Sheikh, Egypt on March 3, 2023. Mariana became the first Mexican to win this title, she became a best model on the international level among top 40 models all over the world.

During her international reign, her presence transcended modeling, she shone on the Paris catwalks, walking for renowned brands such as Simoun Andres, La Pham, Chona Bacaoco, Saqui, and MBC Couture Paris, under the Belle du Silence agency.

Awards and achievements
Preceded by (Czech Republic) Natalie Kocendova	Top Model of the World; 2023	Succeeded by (Romania) Maria Varzaru
Preceded by Fedra Pérez	Top Model Mexico; 2023	Succeeded by Grecia Miranda
Preceded by Ángela Yuriar	Miss Grand Mexico; 2021	Succeeded by Laysha Salazar
