= Miss Universe =

Annual international beauty pageant competition

- Type: International women's beauty pageant
- Parent organization: JKN Legacy Inc.; JKN Global Group; Legacy Holding Group
- Headquarters: Samut Prakan, Thailand; New York City, United States
- First edition: 1952
- Most recent edition: 2026
- Current titleholder: Fátima Bosch; Mexico
- Owners: Jakkaphong Jakrajutatip; Raul Rocha Cantú
- Vice Presidents: Olivia Quido
- Language: English
- Website: www.missuniverse.com

Miss Universe is an annual international major beauty pageant that is run by the Thailand and Mexican-based Miss Universe Organization. Along with Miss World, Miss International, and Miss Earth, it is one of the Big Four beauty pageants.

The Miss Universe Organization and its brand is owned by JKN Global Group and Legacy Holding Group USA Inc., an American division of Mexican company Legacy Holding through the joint venture company JKN Legacy Inc. Telemundo had the licensing rights to air the pageant through 2023. The pageant's advocacy is "humanitarian issues and is a voice to affect positive change in the world".

The reigning Miss Universe is Fátima Bosch from Mexico who was crowned on November 20, 2025, in Pak Kret, Thailand.

== History ==
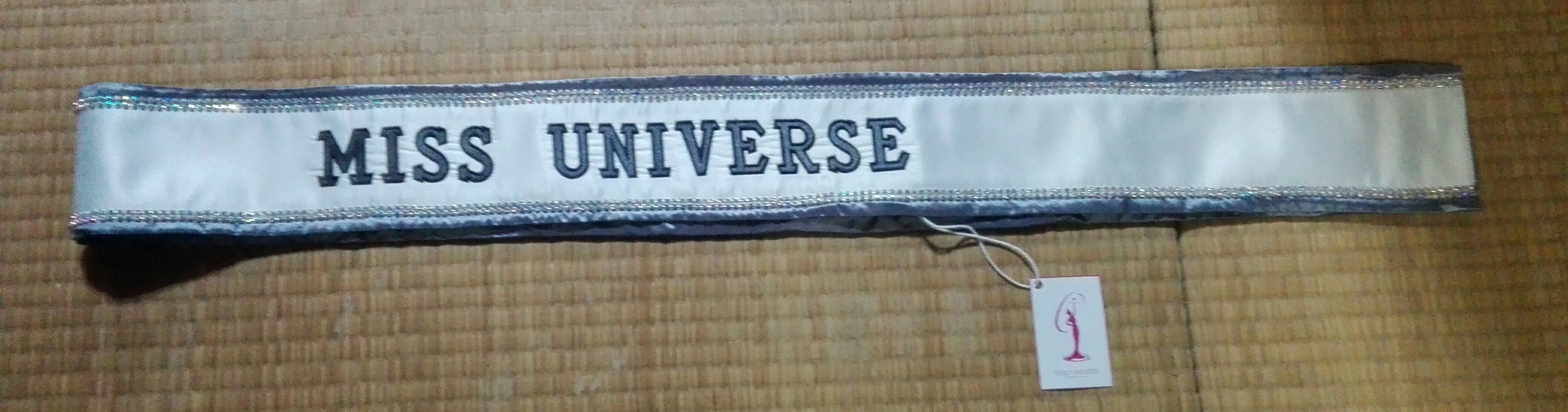
Miss Universe sash from 2001 until 2022

The title "Miss Universe" was first used by the International Pageant of Pulchritude in 1926. This contest was held annually until 1935, when the Great Depression and other events preceding World War II led to its demise.

The current Miss Universe pageant was founded in 1952 by Pacific Knitting Mills, a California-based clothing company and manufacturer of Catalina Swimwear, and it has since been headquartered in the United States. The company sponsored the Miss America pageant until 1951, when the winner, Yolande Betbeze, refused to pose for publicity pictures wearing one of its swimsuits. In 1952, Pacific Knitting Mills organized the Miss USA and Miss Universe pageants, co-sponsoring them for decades.

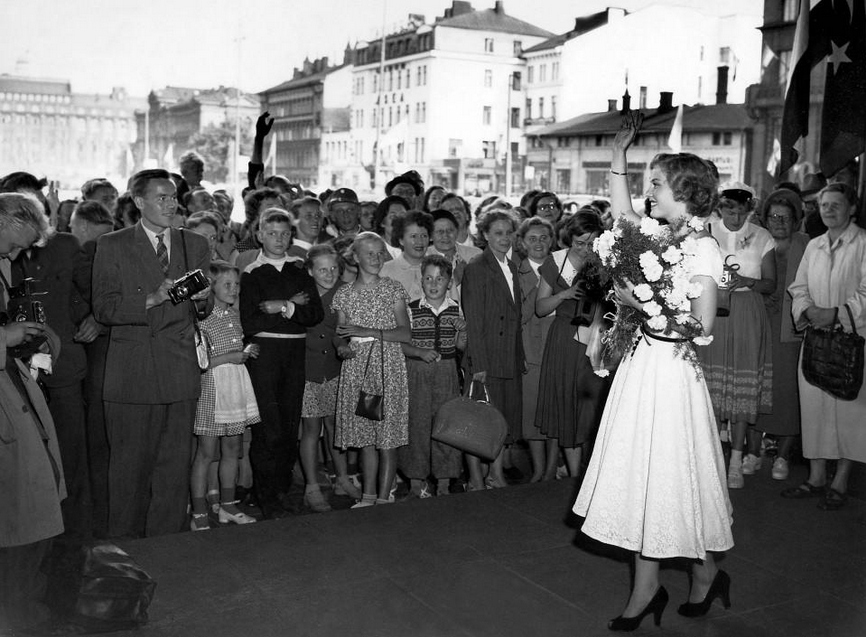
Armi Kuusela, the first titleholder, meets people in Helsinki, Finland

The first Miss Universe Pageant was held in Long Beach, California, in 1952. It was won by Armi Kuusela of Finland, who gave up her title, though not officially, to marry shortly before her year was completed. Until 1958, the Miss Universe title, like that of Miss America, was dated by the year after the contest, so Kuusela's title was Miss Universe 1953. Since its founding by Pacific Mills, the pageant has been organized and conducted by the Miss Universe Organization. Eventually, Pacific Mills and its subsidiaries were acquired by the Kayser-Roth Corporation.

The pageant was first televised in 1955. CBS began broadcasting the combined Miss USA and Miss Universe pageants in 1960, and as separate contests in 1965. In 1975, Gulf and Western Industries bought the Kayser-Roth Corporation. It owned the Miss Universe pageant until 1991, when Procter & Gamble bought it.

In 1996, Donald Trump bought the pageant from ITT Corp, with a broadcasting arrangement with CBS until 2002. In 1998, Miss Universe, Inc. changed its name to the Miss Universe Organization, and moved its headquarters from Los Angeles to New York City. By late 2002, Trump entered into a joint venture with NBC, which in 2003 outbid the other markets for the TV rights. From 2003 to 2014, the pageant was broadcast on NBC in the U.S.

In June 2015, NBC canceled all business relationships with Trump and the Miss Universe Organization in response to controversial statements about immigrants who illegally crossed the border from Mexico. As part of the legal settlement, in September 2015, Trump bought out NBC's 50% stake in the company, making him the company's sole owner. Three days later, he sold the company to WME/IMG. After the change of ownership, Fox and Azteca became the Miss Universe and Miss USA pageants' official broadcasters in October 2015. The Miss Universe Pageant's broadcast rights were temporarily split between Telemundo and FYI during the 2020 pageant amid COVID-19 pandemic restrictions. The contract with Fox and emcee Steve Harvey resumed for the 2021 edition.

On October 26, 2022, Thailand-based JKN Global Group acquired Miss Universe Organization (MUO) from Endeavor Group Holdings-owned IMG Worldwide at $14 million, making Anne Jakapong Jakrajutatip the first transgender woman to own the organization and marking the first time the organization moved its headquarters outside the U.S. Since the 2022 edition, NBC has regained the pageant's broadcast rights via The Roku Channel as a result of the ownership changes, marking the first time in Miss Universe history that the pageant has transitioned from traditional broadcast network coverage to full streaming service in the U.S.

On November 16, 2023, Paula Shugart, president of the Miss Universe Organization, announced her departure from the Miss Universe Organization. She will not be replaced. On February 8, 2024, Miss Universe Organization CEO Amy Emmerich also announced her departure. She left the organization on March 1, 2024. On December 13, 2025 Mario Búcaro has resigned as Chief Executive Officer of the Miss Universe Organization (MUO) fewer than two months after assuming the position. His departure was confirmed in a press release that also outlined his contributions to the global pageant organization.

== Contestant selection ==
To participate in Miss Universe, a country needs a local company or person to buy the competition's local rights through a franchise fee. The fee includes the rights of image, brand, and everything related to the pageant. Often the owner of the franchise returns the franchise to the Miss Universe Organization, which resells it to a new stakeholder. The reselling of the franchise from one owner to another has occurred often in the event's history, sometimes for contractual breaches or financial reasons. The number of participants fluctuates annually because of the franchising of the pageant paired with conflicting schedules to the regular calendar, but has steadied above 70 countries since 1989.

Usually a country's candidate selection involves pageants in the nation's local subdivisions, where local winners compete in a national pageant, but there are some countries who opt for an internal selection. For example, from 2000 to 2004, Australian delegates were chosen by a modeling agency. Although the Miss Universe Organization generally discourages such "castings", Jennifer Hawkins was chosen to represent Australia in Miss Universe 2004 and won the crown. Australia reinstated its national pageant for Miss Universe in 2005.

Recent countries that debuted in the pageant include Cameroon (2020), Bahrain (2021), Bhutan (2022), Pakistan (2023), Belarus, Eritrea, Guinea, Macau, Maldives, Moldova, North Macedonia, Somalia, United Arab Emirates, and Uzbekistan (2024), Cape Verde, Mayotte, Miss Universe Latina, Palestine, and Rwanda (2025). Miss Universe Latina, Palestine, and Rwanda is the latest newcomer and the most recent country to obtain its first ever semifinal placement at Miss Universe, after debuting in 2025 as a semifinalist in the Top 30.

Botswana remains the most recent first-time entry to win Miss Universe in its debut year (with Mpule Kwelagobe in 1999), and Denmark is the most recent country to obtain its first ever national win in Miss Universe (with Victoria Kjær Theilvig in 2024).

Cultural barriers, particularly with the swimsuit competition, and the event's franchise fees have prevented some countries, such as Mozambique, from participating. Nevertheless, the Miss Universe Pageant has been popular in the Americas, Africa, and Asia, especially in the United States, Philippines, Colombia, Peru, Venezuela, South Africa, France, Thailand, and Indonesia, given their track record of multiple semifinal appearances in the last decade and combined titles in the competition's history. As of 2024, only two countries have been present at every Miss Universe since its inception in 1952: Canada and France.

Since 2012, openly transgender women have been allowed to compete. Six years after this rule went into effect, Angela Ponce of Spain became the first openly transgender competitor, in the 2018 edition. In 2019, Myanmar's Swe Zin Htet became the first out lesbian to compete. Spain's Patricia Yurena Rodríguez is the highest-placed LGBT member at Miss Universe, placing second to Venezuela's Gabriela Isler in 2013, but did not come out until years after the competition. In 2021, the Philippines' Beatrice Gomez became the first openly bisexual (and LGBT) contestant to enter the Miss Universe semifinals, after finishing as a finalist in the Top 5 that year. In 2023, Portugal's Marina Machete became the first transgender contestant to enter the Miss Universe semifinals, after finishing as a semifinalist in the Top 20.

Previously, official rules said that pageant contestants "must not have ever been married, not had a marriage annulled nor given birth to, or parented a child. The titleholders are also required to remain unmarried throughout their reign." But in August 2022, the Miss Universe Organization announced that mothers, married, or pregnant women are eligible. This rule has been in effect since 2023. Accepting married contestants renewed tension between the U.S.-based Miss Universe pageant and the Europe-based Mrs. Universe pageant, which was previously the only avenue for married women to compete for the Universe title. Later in 2023, Colombia's Camila Avella became the first candidate to become a mother before clinching a semifinal placement at Miss Universe, after finishing as a finalist in the Top 5.

Miss Universe has always strictly prohibited age fabrication. While the pageant's minimum age has been set at 18, this presents a problem for several European countries that allow 17-year-olds to compete in their pageants. National titleholders under 18 must be replaced by their runners-up or another candidate in the main pageant. In recent years, all Miss Universe candidates have been required to be at least university degree holders or working professionals from the onset of their national pageants. In September 2023, R'Bonney Gabriel announced that the organization would be drop the upper age limit. Previously, contestants had to be less than 29 years old at the start of the pageant. Beginning in 2024, "every adult woman in the world will be eligible to compete to be Miss Universe."

== Main pageant ==
Throughout the history of Miss Universe, the main pageant's scheduling has varied widely. In the last decade, the competition has been consistently held over a two-week period between early November and late January. Because of television schedule demands (largely as a result of international time zone differences) or conflicting national events during the organizing process (such as the COVID-19 pandemic, the Olympics, FIFA World Cup, and elections), four editions (2014, 2016, 2020, and 2022) have been postponed to next year. Since the 2022 edition held in New Orleans in 2023, the Miss Universe Organization has regularly announced the hosting nation of the next edition on coronation night. Between the early 1970s through the late 2000s, the pageant spanned a full month (typically between March and June) to allow time for rehearsals, appearances, and the preliminary competition, with the winner crowned by the previous year's titleholder during the final competition.

According to the organizers, the Miss Universe contest is more than a beauty pageant, though they are expected to participate in swimsuit and evening gown competitions. Women aspiring to become Miss Universe must be intelligent, well-mannered, and cultured. If a candidate is unable to perform well during each round, she may be eliminated. Normally, the candidates' placements are determined by a ranked vote, where each judge ranks the candidates. In the past, semifinalists were chosen by a round-robin system. Between 2017 and 2019, the semifinalists were selected based on highest scores per continental group followed by the judging panel's wildcard list alongside one candidate chosen by the public. In the semifinals, all preliminary results are reset and a new competition starts with the highest-placed positions. In 2020, the round-robin system was reinstated: in each round of the grand final, the group of candidates with the lowest ratings was progressively eliminated. But this criterion has been modified to use weighted averages or points accumulated by stages from the preliminary competition to coronation night, with the assessment in ascending or descending order. From 2011 to 2014 and in 2016, 2020, and since 2022, the public can also select another semifinalist. Since the pageant's inception, all semifinalists have been announced at the beginning of the live telecast regardless of the edition's format. If ties occur in the final rounds, the preliminary results are used.

The winner signs a contract with the Miss Universe Organization that can last from seven months to more than a year as per the organization's demands. Miss Universe takes office immediately after coronation and takes on a public cause for which she becomes the ambassador for a year to spread messages about the control of diseases, peace, AIDS awareness, women's and ethnic minority rights, contemporary racial issues, public health issues, or the consequences of global warming. The winner also receives a cash allowance for her reign, a New York Film Academy scholarship, a modeling portfolio, beauty products, clothes, shoes, styling, healthcare, and fitness services from the pageant's sponsors. She has access to events such as fashion shows and opening galas, as well as casting calls and modeling opportunities in New York City. Between 1996 and 2015, the winner was given a Trump Place apartment in New York City, which she shared with the Miss USA and Miss Teen USA titleholders. Starting in 2022, the winner and the two runners-up in the Top 3 have shuttled between residences in New York and Bangkok.

If for any reason the winner cannot fulfill her duties as Miss Universe, the first runner-up takes over. This protocol has happened only once as of 2024, when Panama's Justine Pasek succeeded Russia's Oxana Fedorova as Miss Universe in 2002 after Fedorova's termination that year. Aside from the winner and her runners-up, special awards are also given to the winners of the Best National Costume, Miss Photogenic, and Miss Congeniality. The Miss Congeniality award is chosen by the delegates themselves. In recent years, Miss Photogenic has been chosen by popular internet vote (she used to be chosen by media personnel covering the event), and the winning country for Best National Costume is announced after the naming of the semifinalists during finals night. Starting in 2024, Continental Queens are announced who travel with Miss Universe.

== Crowns of Miss Universe ==
There have been twelve winners crowns since the pageant began.

- The Romanov Imperial Nuptial Crown (1952) was the first crown. It was previously owned by the Russian czar. It contains 1,529 flawless diamonds weighing 300 carats and was insured for US$500,000. It was used to crown Armi Kuusela in 1952.
- The Christiane Martell Crown (1953), also known as the Metallic Bronze Crown due to its solid metallic bronze design, replaced the first crown. Miss Universe 1953 Christiane Martel was the only titleholder to wear it.
- The Star of the Universe Crown (1954–1960) was named for the star shape at its top. It is made up of approximately 1,000 oriental cultured black pearls set in solid gold and platinum and weighed 1.25 pounds (0.57 kg). It was insured for US$500,000.
- The Rhinestone Crown (1961–1962) was made from rhinestones. It debuted in 1961 as part of the tenth anniversary of the Miss Universe Organization. Marlene Schmidt and Norma Nolan wore this crown.
- The Coventry Crown (1963–2001) was designed by the jeweler Sarah Coventry. She remade the rhinestone crown to feature a female figure holding a scepter as its main centerpiece, leading to it being called the Lady Crown. The design was modified in 1973 for the wearer's convenience and it was popularly known as The Chandelier Crown. The cheaper cost of its rhinestone design made it possible to create exact replicas of the crown to be given to outgoing titleholders. In the late 1980’s, the crowns were made by International Gem and Jewelry Show, Inc. Miss Universe 2001 Denise Quinones was its last holder.
- The Mikimoto Phoenix Crown (2002–2008 and 2017–2018) was used for the fifty-first anniversary of the Miss Universe organization. It was designed by Tomohiro Yamaji for the Mikimoto Company, who were the official jewelry sponsor of the Miss Universe Organization. The crown depicted the phoenix rising, signifying status, power, and beauty, as stipulated in their sponsorship deal. The crown has 500 natural colorless diamonds of almost 30 carats (6.0 g) and 120 South Sea and Akoya pearls, ranging in size from 3 to 18 mm diameter, and was valued at US$250,000. The crown was designed for the pageant on Mikimoto Pearl Island in Japan, with the Mikimoto crown and tiara being first used for Miss Universe 2002, which was unveiled by former proprietor Donald Trump. In 2017,after WME/IMG reportedly sued the Diamond International Company due to a breach of contract in August 2017. After failing to make payments, IMG canceled the contract with DIC and the Mikimoto Crown was used again during the next two years.
- The CAO Crown (2008) was used to crown Dayana Mendoza in 2008. It is a tiara designed by Rosalina Lydster and Dang Kim Lien of CAO Fine Jewelry from Vietnam. It was valued at US$120,000, and was made from a combination of 18K white and yellow gold and has over 1,000 precious stones. These include 555 white diamonds (30 carats), 375 cognac diamonds (14 carats), 10 smoky quartz crystals (20 carats), and 19 morganite gemstones (60 carats).
- The Diamond Nexus Peace Crown (2009–2013) was made by Diamond Nexus Labs. This crown won when fans worldwide were given the opportunity to vote online in 2009 to determine which of the Unity, Hope, and Peace Crowns would be the next crown of Miss Universe. The crown is set with 1,371 gemstones, weighing a total of 416.09 carats (83.218 g). It contains 544.31 grams (19.2 oz) of 14K and 18K white gold as well as platinum. In 2010, the top arches of the crown were removed for the wearer's convenience. The crown features synthetic rubies to represent Miss Universe's HIV/AIDS education and awareness platform. Diamond Nexus Labs were the first ever eco-friendly official jeweler of the Miss Universe organization and were selected as part of NBC Universal's Green is Universal initiative.
- The DIC Crown (2014–2016) was used to crown Paulina Vega, Pia Wurtzbach, and Iris Mittenaere. It was produced by Czech company Diamonds International Corporation (DIC) and estimated to be worth US$300,000. It took approximately four months to manufacture and required the work of ten artisans. The crown is reminiscent of the Manhattan skyline and is composed of 311 diamonds, 5 pieces of blue topaz, 198 pieces of blue sapphire, 33 pieces of heat-fired crystals, and 220 grams of 18K white gold. The total weight of the crown is 411 grams (14.5 oz). It was retired in 2017 due to a copyright infringement and subsequent payment issues between DIC and the Miss Universe Organization.
- The Mouawad Power of Unity Crown (2019–2021) was made by Mouawad Jewelry. With an estimated worth of almost US$6 million, the Mouawad crown was the world's most expensive set of pageant crowns on record. From 2019 to 2021, Zozibini Tunzi, Andrea Meza, and Harnaaz Sandhu were crowned with it. The crown consists of a golden canary diamond that weighs 62.83 carats. According to Pascal Mouawad, the crown symbolizes ambition, diversity, community, and beauty.
- The Mouawad Force for Good Crown (2022–2023) is the second Mouawad crown and was used to crown R'Bonney Gabriel and Sheynnis Palacios. It holds 110 carats of blue sapphires, 48 carats of white diamonds, and a 45.14 carat royal blue sapphire at its center.
- The Jewelmer Lumière de l’Infini Crown (2024–2025), was designed by Philippine-based luxury jewelry company Jewelmer, known for specializing in golden Philippine South Sea pearls. It was handcrafted using traditional Filipino and French jewelry design and techniques, particularly the Place Vendôme technique. Each of the golden pearls was harvested and prepared through 377 steps. Its gold and platinum metal foundations resemble those of the waves and the dance of the universe, which are adorned with hundreds of diamonds and 23 golden South Sea pearls. The biggest golden pearl featured at the top-center of the crown represents the sun, surrounded with diamond-adorned golden rays.

=== Gallery of Miss Universe crowns ===
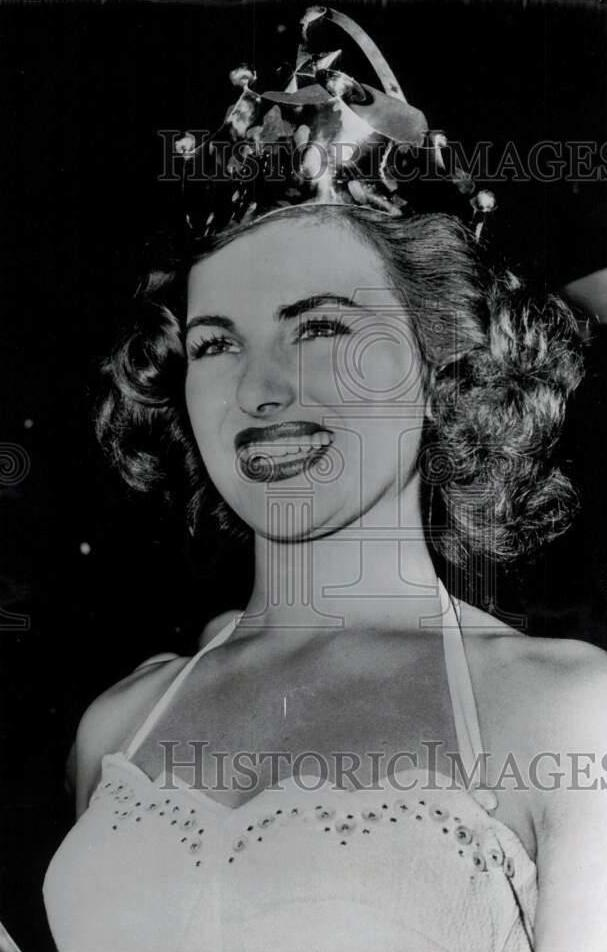
The Christiane Martell Crown, worn by Miss Universe 1953 Christiane Martel

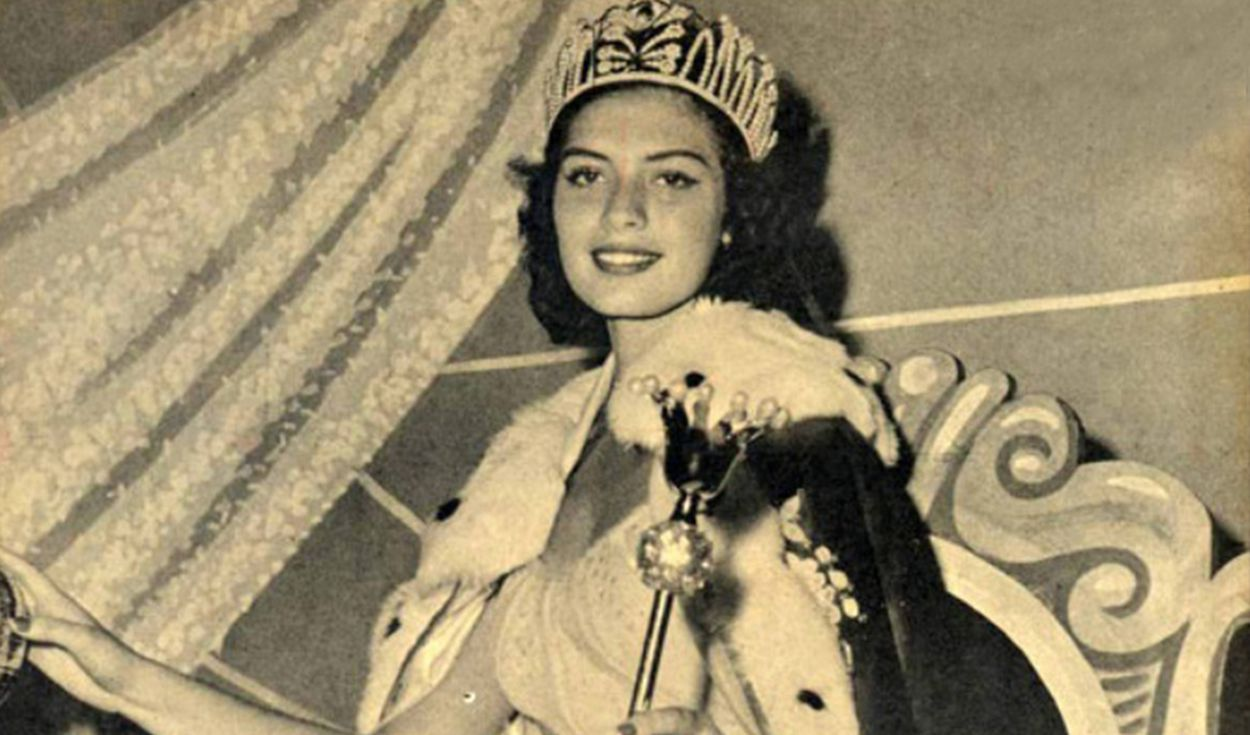
The Star of the Universe Crown, worn by Miss Universe 1957 Gladys Zender

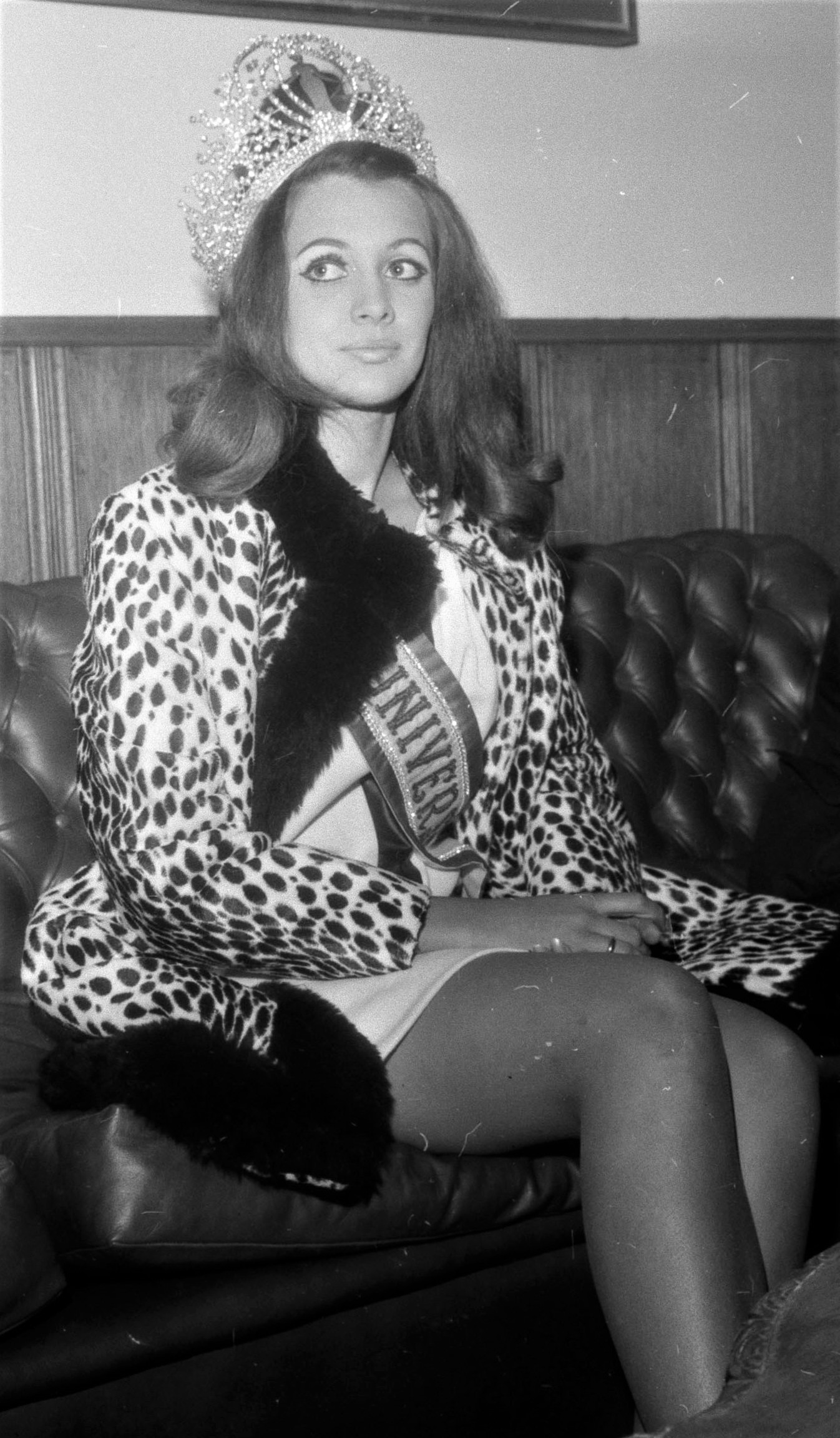
The Coventry Crown, worn by Miss Universe 1968, Martha Vasconcellos

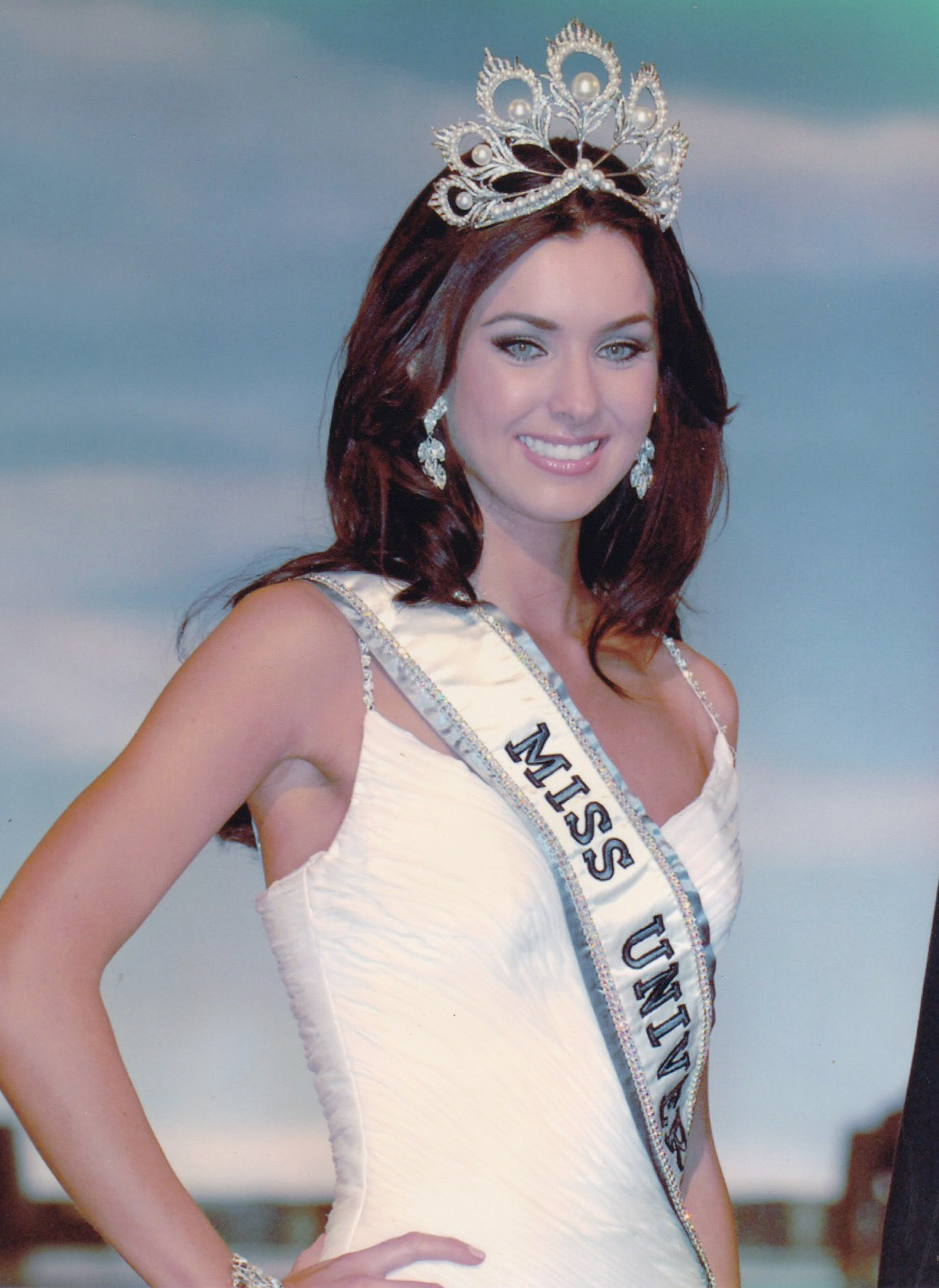
The Mikimoto Phoenix Crown, worn by Miss Universe 2005 Natalie Glebova

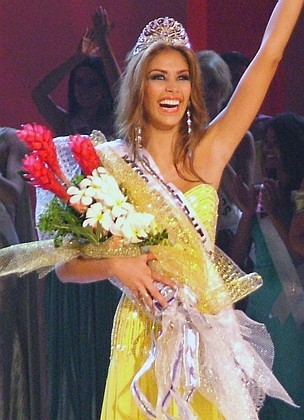
The CAO Crown, worn by Miss Universe 2008 Dayana Mendoza

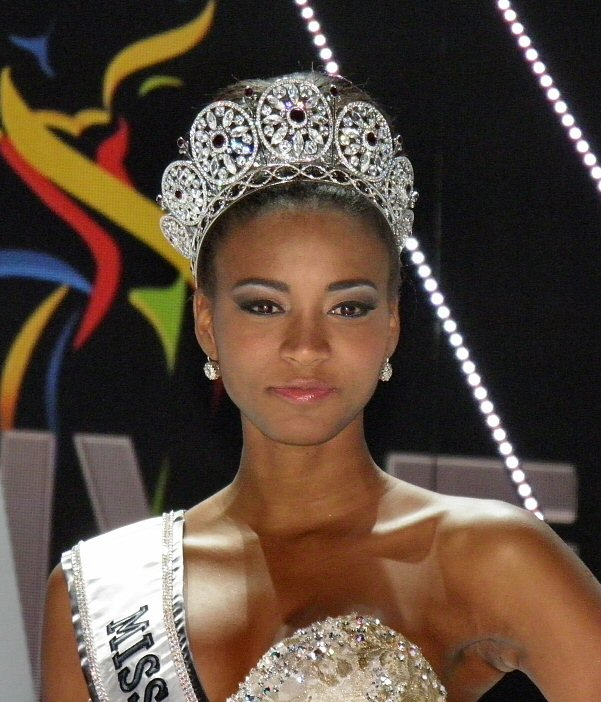
The Diamond Nexus Peace Crown, worn by Miss Universe 2011 Leila Lopes

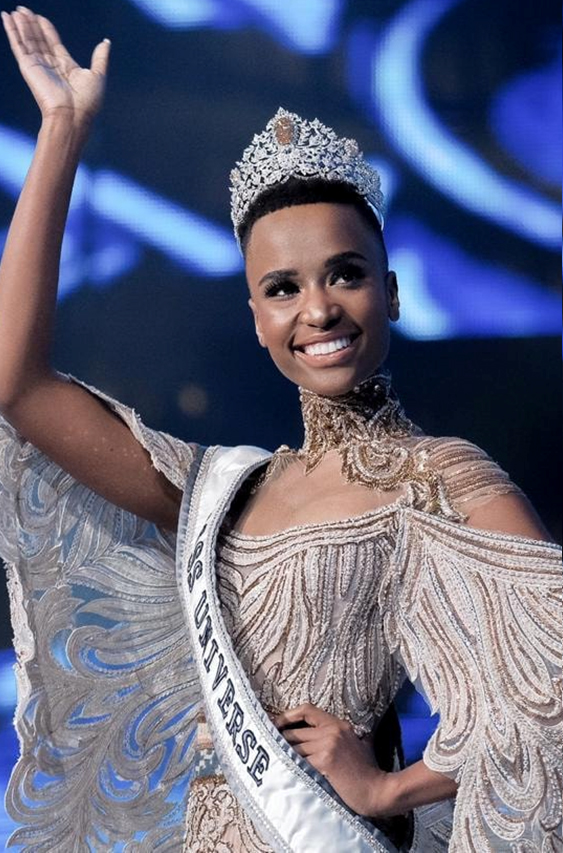
The Mouawad Power of Unity Crown, worn by Miss Universe 2019 Zozibini Tunzi

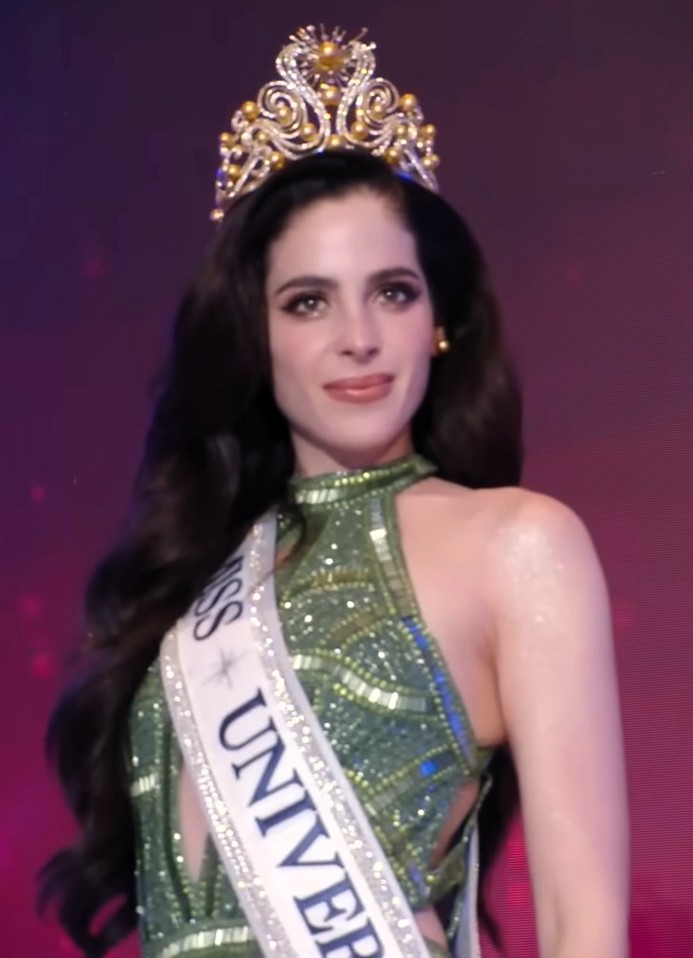
The Light of Infinity Crown, worn by Miss Universe 2025 Fátima Bosch

== Recent titleholders ==
Edition (Year)	Represented	Miss Universe	National title	Location	Number of entrants
74th (2025)	Mexico	Fátima Bosch	Miss Universe Mexico 2025	Nonthaburi, Thailand	118
73rd (2024)	Denmark	Victoria Kjær Theilvig	Miss Universe Denmark 2024	Mexico City, Mexico	125
72nd (2023)	Nicaragua	Sheynnis Palacios	Miss Nicaragua 2023	San Salvador, El Salvador	84
71st (2022)	United States	R'Bonney Gabriel	Miss USA 2022	New Orleans, Louisiana, United States	83
70th (2021)	India	Harnaaz Sandhu	Miss Diva Universe 2021	Eilat, Israel	80

== Miss Universe Organization ==
The Miss Universe Organization owns and runs the Miss Universe, Miss USA, and Miss Teen USA beauty pageants. Between 2020 and 2022, it stopped organizing the Miss USA and the Miss Teen USA competitions. They were operated by Crystle Stewart until her suspension in October 2022, after which they returned to the Miss Universe Organization.

Based in New York City and Bangkok, the organization has been owned by the Thai JKN Global Group since October 2022, when WME/IMG sold the pageant. The organization sells television rights to the pageants and pageant organizations in other countries.

=== Gallery ===
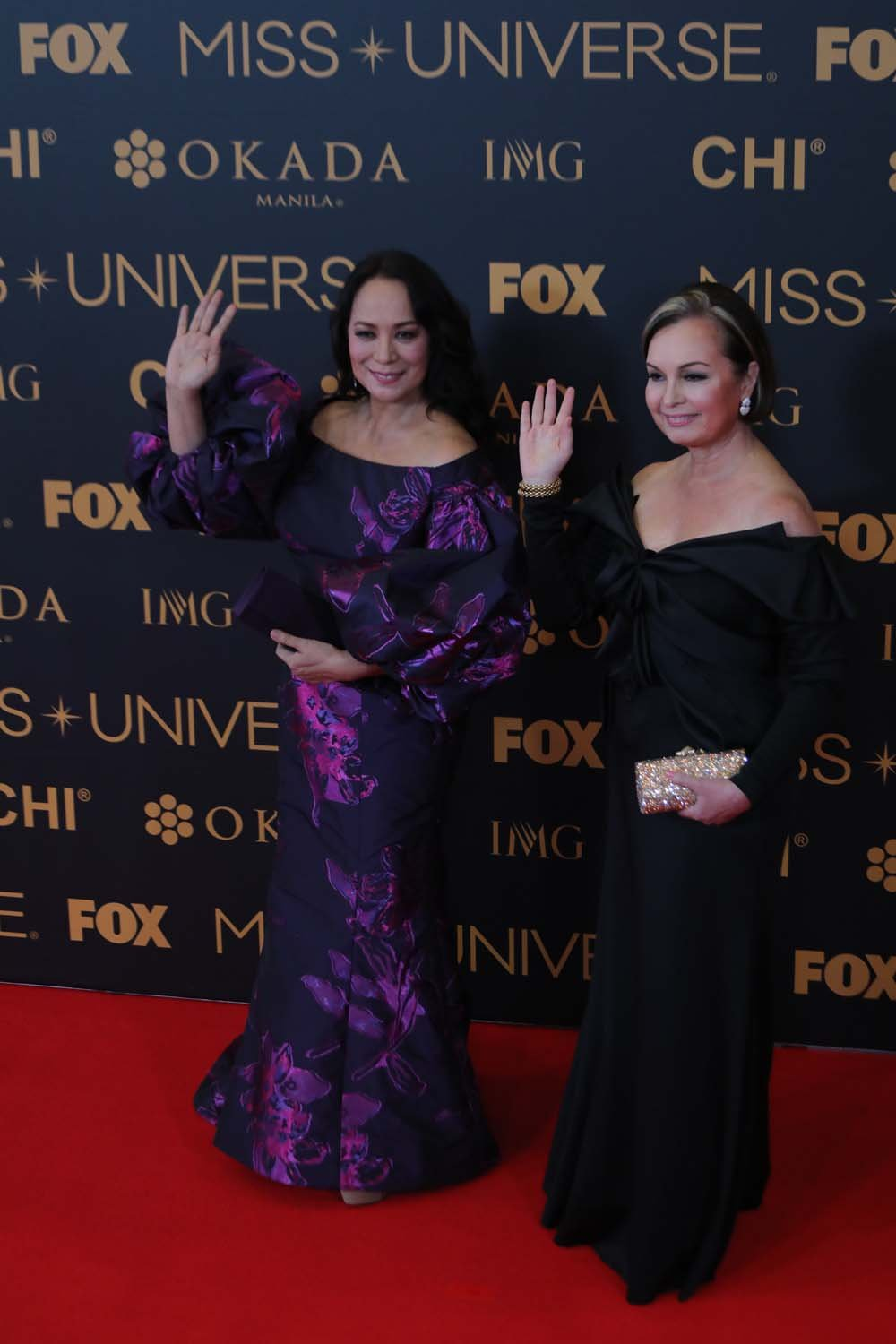
Gloria Diaz, Miss Universe 1969, and Margarita Moran, Miss Universe 1973, at the Miss Universe 2016 red carpet - Mall of Asia Arena, Manila, the Philippines

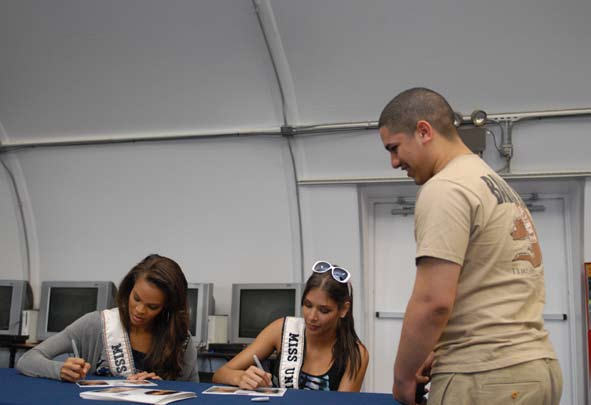
Crystle Stewart, Miss USA 2008 and Dayana Mendoza, Miss Universe 2008 at Guantanamo Bay

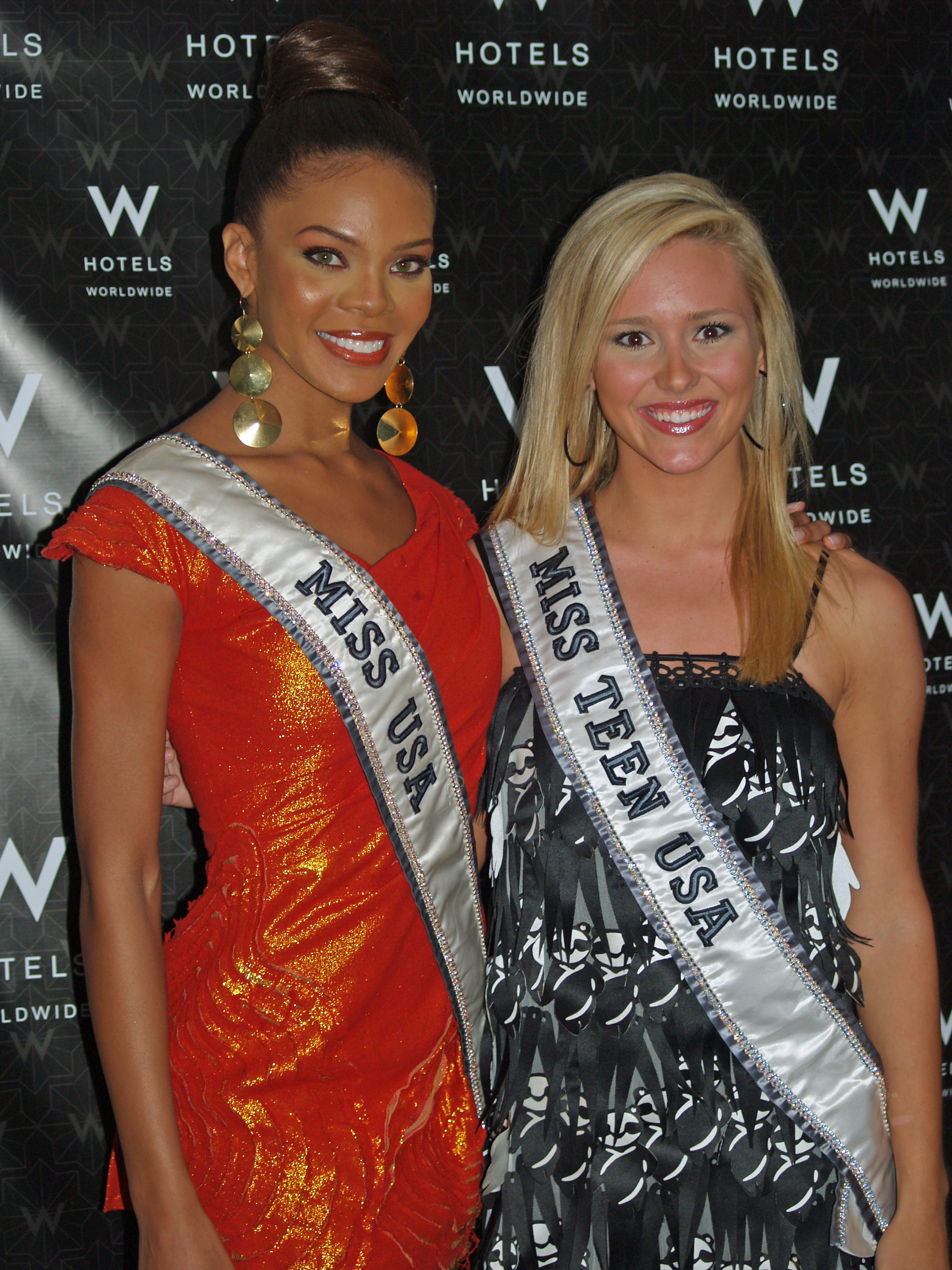
Crystle Stewart, Miss USA 2008 and Stevi Perry, Miss Teen USA 2008

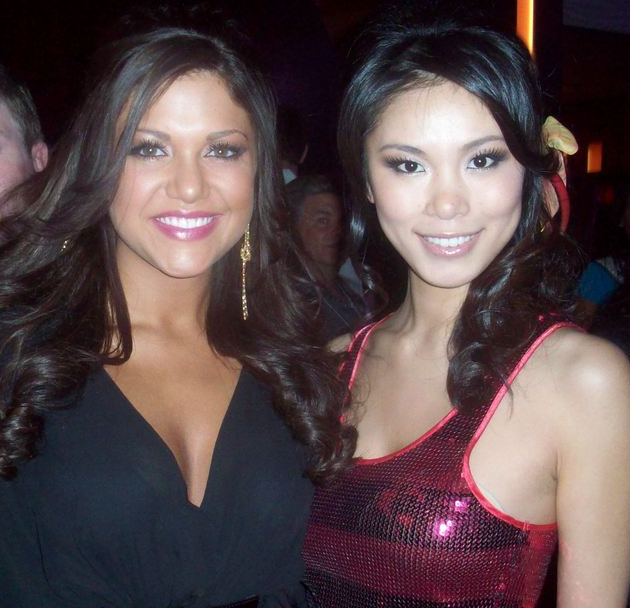
Hilary Cruz, Miss Teen USA 2007 and Riyo Mori, Miss Universe 2007 attend the "Fashion Rocks the Universe" event prior to the Miss USA 2008 pageant.

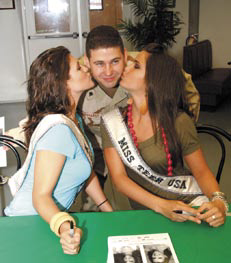
Chelsea Cooley, Miss USA 2005 and Shelley Hennig, Miss Teen USA 2004 at Guantanamo Bay

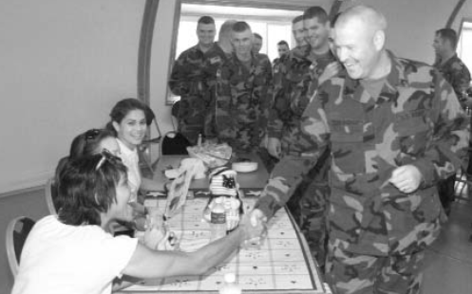
Miss Universe 2002, Justine Pasek, with Miss USA 2002, Shauntay Hinton and Miss Teen USA 2002, Vanessa Semrow at Guantanamo Bay

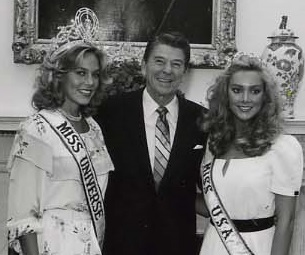
Shawn Weatherly, Miss Universe 1980 and Kim Seelbrede, Miss USA 1981 together with then-US President Ronald Reagan

== In other media ==
- Electronic Arts was reportedly developing a video game based on the pageant in 2013, but development status is currently uncertain due to the closure of EA Black Box, the studio allegedly developing the game.
- Crown of Deceit: Inside the Miss Universe Scandal (2026), documentary that follows the history and controversies of the organization

== See also ==
- List of beauty pageants
- Big Four beauty pageants
