= Miss Grand Vietnam 2025 =

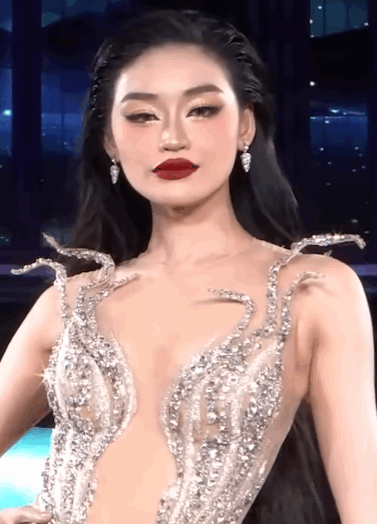
- Nguyễn Thị Yến Nhi
- Date: September 14, 2025
- Presenters: Thiên Vũ; Lona Kiều Loan; Phạm Tuấn Ngọc
- Entertainment: Hera Ngọc Hằng; Nguyễn Trần Trung Quân; Võ Minh Lâm; Denis Đặng; Vũ Thị Thu Hiền
- Venue: LaChateau Hotel, Phú Định ward, Hồ Chí Minh City, Vietnam
- Broadcaster: YouTube; Facebook Live; TikTok Live
- Entrants: 35
- Placements: 20
- Winner: Nguyễn Thị Yến Nhi; Đắk Lắk

Miss Grand Vietnam 2025 (Vietnamese: Hoa hậu Hòa bình Việt Nam 2025) was the fourth edition of the Miss Grand Vietnam pageant. It was held on September 14, 2025, at LaChateau Hotel in Hồ Chí Minh City. Thirty-five contestants from different provinces and cities competed for the title.

Nguyễn Thị Yến Nhi, a 21-year-old freelance artist representing Đắk Lắk, was named the winner and crowned by Miss Grand Vietnam 2024, Võ Lê Quế Anh of Quảng Nam. She represented Vietnam at Miss Grand International 2025 to be held in Bangkok, Thailand.

== Background ==
The contest also expanded the age range from 18 to 35 years old. Compared to previous years, this year the competition will not have a semi-final round.

On July 11, the contest announced LaChateau Hotel, Phú Định ward, Hồ Chí Minh City, Vietnam as the host of the contest. This year's contest will hold castings across Vietnam in major cities.

Miss Grand Vietnam 2022 Đoàn Thiên Ân becomes "Grand Power of voice Ambassador" with the mission of spreading the spirit and inspiring voice for the competition. Besides, 1st Runner-Up of Miss Grand Vietnam 2024 Lê Phan Hạnh Nguyên become "Grand Inspriration Ambassador" with the mission of accompanying the candidates throughout the activities.

The contest's judges include: actor Quốc Trường; singer Nhật Kim Anh; journalist, former Deputy Minister of Culture, Sports and Tourism Vương Duy Biên; pharmacist Phạm Hữu Tiến; Miss Vietnam 1992 Hà Kiều Anh; master Ms. Thu Hường; Miss Grand Vietnam 2023 Lê Hoàng Phương and Miss Grand Vietnam 2022 Đoàn Thiên Ân. Miss Grand International 2024 CJ Opiaza, Amy Viranya Berry and Harriotte Lane are some of the featured guests.

== Results ==
=== Main placements ===
Ref.	Placement	Candidate
	Miss Grand Vietnam 2025	Đắk Lắk – Nguyễn Thị Yến Nhi
	1st Runner-Up	Cà Mau – Nguyễn Thị Thu Ngân
	2nd Runner-Up	Nghệ An – Lê Thị Thu Trà
	3rd Runner-Up	Gia Lai – Đinh Y Quyên
	4th Runner-Up	An Giang – La Ngọc Phương Anh
	Top 10	Tây Ninh – Nguyễn Thị Kiều My; Đắk Lắk – Bùi Thị Uyên Phương (#); Đắk Lắk – Mlo H Senaivi; Đà Nẵng – Phan Huỳnh Như Thùy; Hưng Yên – Bùi Thu Thủy
	Top 15	Hưng Yên – Nguyễn Thị Kim Anh; Ho Chi Minh City – Nguyễn Phương Hoa; Hải Phòng – Nguyễn Thị Hồng; Ho Chi Minh City – Nguyễn Hồng Ngân (@); Đồng Nai – Phạm Khánh Ngân; Lâm Đồng – Văn Minh Trúc
	Top 20	Ninh Bình – Tống Thị Lan Anh; Vĩnh Long – Ngô Thái Ngân (&); Tây Ninh – Trần Như Ngọc; Ho Chi Minh City – Phạm Yến; Ho Chi Minh City – Đỗ Thị Tường Vi (§)

Notes:

- § – Automatically qualified for the top 20 by winning the Grand Arrival award.
- & – Automatically qualified for the top 20 by winning the Grand Voice award.
- @ – Automatically qualified for the top 20 by winning the Grand Heat award.
- # – Automatically qualified for the top 10 by winning the Popular Vote award.

=== Special awards ===
Special Award	Contestant	Ref.
Best Grand Arrival	Winner: Đỗ Thị Tường Vi – Ho Chi Minh City; Top 15: Phạm Hải Yến – Ho Chi Minh City; Nguyễn Thị Thu Ngân – Cà Mau; Lê Thị Thu Trà – Nghệ An; Đinh Y Quyên – Gia Lai; Phan Huỳnh Như Thuỳ – Đà Nẵng; Nguyễn Thị Loan – Tuyên Quang; Ngô Thái Ngân – Vĩnh Long; Đặng Thị Diệu Huê – Cần Thơ; Mai Thị Thuỳ Linh – Thanh Hoá; Nguyễn Thị Yến Nhi – Đắk Lắk; Nguyễn Thị Hồng – Hải Phòng; Phan Thị Hồng Yến – An Giang; La Ngọc Phương Anh – An Giang; Nguyễn Hồng Ngân – Ho Chi Minh City	
Grand Voice Award	Winner: Vĩnh Long – Ngô Thái Ngân; Top 5: Tây Ninh – Trần Như Ngọc; Đà Nẵng – Phan Huỳnh Như Thùy; Ho Chi Minh City – Phạm Tiên; An Giang – La Ngọc Phương Anh; Top 10: Cà Mau – Nguyễn Thị Thu Ngân; Đăk Lăk – Nguyễn Thị Yến Nhi; Khánh Hòa – Trần Thị Xuân Dung; Quảng Ngãi – Lê Tuyết Nhi; Ho Chi Minh City – Đỗ Thị Tường Vi	
Fashion challenge	Winner: Hải Phòng – Nguyễn Thị Hồng; Top 5: Đồng Nai – Phạm Khánh Ngân; Đắk Lắk – Nguyễn Thị Yến Nhi; Hưng Yên – Bùi Thu Thủy; Nghệ An – Lê Thị Thu Trà	
Grand Heat	Winner: Hồ Chí Minh City – Nguyễn Hồng Ngân; Top 5: Cà Mau – Nguyễn Thị Thu Ngân; Đắk Lắk – Nguyễn Thị Yến Nhi; Gia Lai – Đinh Y Quyên; Nghệ An – Lê Thị Thu Trà; The Grand Heat by Fan Vote: Ninh Bình – Tống Thị Lan Anh	
Laura challenge	Winner: Hưng Yên – Bùi Thu Thuỷ; Top 5: Nghệ An – Lê Thị Thu Trà; Danang – Phan Như Thuỳ; Can Tho – Nguyễn Ngọc Khôi Nguyên; Ho Chi Minh City – Nguyễn Hồng Ngân	
Best Profile Picture	Winner: Tây Ninh – Trần Như Ngọc; Top 3: Hưng Yên – Bùi Thu Thủy; Đắk Lắk – Mlô H Senaivi	
Impression challenge	An Giang – La Ngọc Phương Anh; Hải Phòng – Nguyễn Thị Hồng; Tuyên Quang – Nguyễn Thị Loan; Gia Lai – Đinh Y Quyên; Đà Nẵng – Phan Như Thùy; Lâm Đồng – Văn Minh Trúc	
Popular Vote	Winner: Đắk Lắk – 5,698,061 – Bùi Thị Uyên Phương; Top 5: Quảng Ngãi – 5,663,945 – Lê Tuyết Nhi; Hải Phòng – 181,264 – Nguyễn Thị Hồng; Tây Ninh – 40,443 – Trần Như Ngọc; Đà Nẵng – 34,390 – Phan Huỳnh Như Thùy	
Best in Evening Gown	Hải Phòng – Nguyễn Thị Hồng	
Grand Trend	Tây Ninh – Nguyễn Thị Kiều My	
Grand Walk	Cà Mau – Nguyễn Thị Thu Ngân	
Best Introduction	Ho Chi Minh City – Phạm Yến	
Best Introduction Video	Vĩnh Long – Ngô Thái Ngân	
Grand Business	Đà Nẵng – Phan Như Thùy	
Grand Shoot	Hưng Yên – Bùi Thu Thủy	
Best Peace Presentation	An Giang – La Ngọc Phương Anh	

=== Extracurricular competition ===
	Prize	Ingredient	Ref.
The Grand National Costume
The Grand National Costume	Main line	(gold) – "Thăng Long hội" by Nguyễn Huy Hoàng (team mentor Đặng Trọng Minh Châu); (silver) – "Châu ro cầu rùa" by Phạm Thị Ngọc Trang (team mentor Nguyễn Việt Hùng); (bronze) – "Thánh ngư yên hải" by Hà Huy Giang (team mentor Vũ Việt Hà); (bronze) – "Tinh hoa nghề bột" by Nguyễn Phước Thịnh (team mentor Ivan Trần)	
The Grand National Costume	Other line	People's Choice: "Linh xà thất sơn" by Phạm Minh Mẫn (team mentor Ivan Trần); Performance: "Bún cá Châu Đốc" by Huỳnh Kim Quý, performance by Nguyễn Thị Kiều My (team mentor Đặng Trọng Minh Châu); Best Design Team Mentor: team Ivan Trần	
Crown Design Competition	(gold) – Solara Aurelia crown by Bùi Thế Bảo and Nguyễn Nguyên Bảo; (silver) – Flow of Heritage crown by Huỳnh Hoài Thương; (bronze) – Sắc phượng trầu têm crown by Đặng Vũ Phương; Best Crown Design by People's Choice: Solara Aurelia crown by Bùi Thế Bảo and Nguyễn Nguyên Bảo		

== Contestants ==
Fifty-five contestants qualified for the final screening round, where the number of qualified candidates was then reduced to 35.

55 Pre-final Contestants
Contestants	Age	Hometown
Nguyễn Thị Thúy Thảo	2005	Đà Nẵng
Tống Thị Lan Anh	2005	Ninh Bình
Quách Thanh Thư	2003	Cà Mau
Nguyễn Thị Kim Anh	2003	Hưng Yên
Trần Như Ngọc	1995	Tây Ninh
Nguyễn Thị Thu Ngân	2003	Cà Mau
Nguyễn Thị Thanh Thanh	2001	Quảng Ninh
Trần Tuyết Vân	2000	Cà Mau
Nguyễn Tường Vi	2002	Cà Mau
Nguyễn Ngọc Gia Hân	2003	Lâm Đồng
Phạm Thị Kim Oanh	2001	Hà Nội
Trần Ái Tiên	1998	Tây Ninh
Phan Huỳnh Như Thùy	1995	Đà Nẵng
Nguyễn Thị Thảo	2003	Thanh Hóa
Võ Ngọc Hân	2000	Khánh Hòa
Đào Thị Huỳnh Ân	1996	Vĩnh Long
Nguyễn Thị Yến Nhi	2004	Đắk Lắk
Nguyễn Thị Loan	1999	Tuyên Quang
Phạm Tiên	1991	Ho Chi Minh City
Văn Minh Trúc	1994	Lâm Đồng
Nguyễn Thị Hồng	1998	Hải Phòng
Dương Ngọc Gấm	2003	Đồng Nai
Bùi Thu Thủy	2003	Hưng Yên
Phạm Thị Như	2002	An Giang
Lê Thị Thu Trà	2002	Nghệ An
Nguyễn Đức Minh Tú	2001	Hà Nội
Ngô Thái Ngân	1994	Vĩnh Long
Phạm Thị Hồng Yến	2003	An Giang
Nguyễn Thị Ngọc Thảo	2003	An Giang
Nguyễn Thị Hồng Mây	2006	Phú Thọ
Nguyễn Thị Nhiền	2001	Cần Thơ
Phạm Tùng Chi	2004	Hà Nội
Đinh Y Quyên	1997	Gia Lai
Nguyễn Thị Trầm Hương	1997	An Giang
Nguyễn Phương Anh	2006	Bắc Ninh
Nguyễn Thị Thanh Ngân	2001	Đồng Tháp
Mlô H Senaivi	2001	Đắk Lắk
Trần Thị Xuân Dung	2000	Khánh Hòa
Đặng Thị Diệu Huê	1990	Cần Thơ
Nguyễn Thị Kiều My	1999	Tây Ninh
La Ngọc Phương Anh	2005	An Giang
Đỗ Ngyễn Ngọc Mai	2006	Vĩnh Long
Mai Thị Thùy Linh	2002	Thanh Hóa
Nguyễn Hồng Ngân	2000	Ho Chi Minh City
Huỳnh Phạm Đoan Trang	1992	Ho Chi Minh City
Đinh Kim Chi	2002	Hưng Yên
Đoàn Thị Hương Giang	2001	Ninh Bình
Nguyễn Thị Cẩm Hằng	2001	Vĩnh Long
Lê Thị Hà VI	1997	Hà Nội
Bùi Thị Phương Uyên	2001	Đắk Lắk
Lê Tuyết Nhi	2003	Quảng Ngãi
Nguyễn Phương Hoa	1995	Ho Chi Minh City
Nguyễn Thị Ngọc Giang Vân	2001	Cần Thơ
Đỗ Thị Tường Vi	2002	Ho Chi Minh City

35 Finalized Contestants
Represented	Contestants	Code number
An Giang I	Phan Thị Hồng Yến	368
An Giang II	La Ngọc Phương Anh	027
Cần Thơ I	Dương Ngọc Trâm	399
Cần Thơ II	Nguyễn Ngọc Khôi Nguyên	165
Cần Thơ III	Đặng Thị Diệu Huê	332
Cà Mau I	Nguyễn Thị Thu Ngân	522
Cà Mau II	Quách Thanh Thư	153
Đắk Lắk I	Mlô H Senaivi	284
Đắk Lắk II	Nguyễn Thị Yến Nhi	379
Đắk Lắk III	Bùi Thị Uyên Phương	116
Đà Nẵng	Phan Huỳnh Như Thùy	678
Đồng Nai	Phạm Khánh Ngân	268
Đồng Tháp	Nguyễn Thị Thanh Ngân	578
Gia Lai	Đinh Y Quyên	303
Hải Phòng	Nguyễn Thị Hồng	182
Hà Nội I	Lê Thị Hà Vi	416
Hà Nội II	Phạm Tùng Chi	055
Ho Chi Minh City I	Nguyễn Hồng Ngân	606
Ho Chi Minh City II	Đỗ Thị Tường Vi	273
Ho Chi Minh City III	Phạm Hải Yến	879
Ho Chi Minh City IV	Nguyễn Phương Hoa	305
Hưng Yên I	Nguyễn Thị Kim Anh	311
Hưng Yên II	Bùi Thu Thuỷ	145
Khánh Hòa	Trần Thị Xuân Dung	178
Lâm Đồng	Văn Minh Trúc	066
Nghệ An	Lê Thị Thu Trà	456
Ninh Bình	Tống Thị Lan Anh	164
Quảng Ngãi	Lê Tuyết Nhi	179
Tây Ninh I	Nguyễn Thị Kiều My	102
Tây Ninh II	Trần Như Ngọc	079
Thanh Hóa	Mai Thị Thùy Linh	113
Tuyên Quang	Nguyễn Thị Loan	256
Vĩnh Long I	Đào Huỳnh Ân	010
Vĩnh Long II	Ngô Thái Ngân	051
Vĩnh Long III	Nguyễn Thị Cẩm Hằng	023
