= Miss Grand Vietnam 2026 =

- Date: July 31, 2026
- Presenters: Trần Thiên Vũ; Lương Thùy Linh; Lê Phương Khánh Như
- Entertainment: Trang Pháp; S.T Sơn Thạch; Hương Giang
- Venue: LaChateau Hotel, Phú Định ward, Hồ Chí Minh City, Vietnam
- Broadcaster: YouTube; Facebook Live; TikTok Live
- Entrants: 30
- Placements: 20
- Winner: Emoura Phạm; Hồ Chí Minh City

Miss Grand Vietnam 2026 (Vietnamese: Hoa hậu Hòa bình Việt Nam 2026) was the 5th edition of the Miss Grand Vietnam pageant, held on July 31, 2026, at the LaChateau Hotel in Hồ Chí Minh City, Vietnam. Thirty contestants competed for the title, with placements awarded to the top 20. The competition featured several fast-track events, including Grand Arrival, Grand Talent Award, Grand Fashion Award, Best in Swimsuit, Grand Business Award, Miss Popular Vote, and The Grand Chat, some of which guaranteed advancement to later rounds.

At the end of the event, Emoura Phạm of Hồ Chí Minh City was crowned by the outgoing titleholder Nguyễn Thị Yến Nhi of Đắk Lắk. The first runner-up, Ngô Bảo Ngọc, was designated to represent Vietnam at the MGI All Stars 2nd Edition, while Emoura Phạm will represent Vietnam at Miss Grand International 2026 in India.

== Results ==
Color keys

- Declared as the winner in an international pageant.
- Ended as runner-up in an international pageant.
- Ended as finalist or semi-finalist in an international pageant.
- Unplaced.

Placement	Contestant	International Pageant	International Placement
Miss Grand Vietnam 2026	TP. Hồ Chí Minh – Emoura Phạm	Miss Grand International 2026	4th Runner-Up
1st Runner-Up	TP. Hồ Chí Minh – Ngô Bảo Ngọc	MGI All Stars 2nd Edition	Withdrawn
2nd Runner-Up	Đồng Nai – Võ Đoàn Bảo Hà		
3rd Runner-Up	Cần Thơ – Phan Lê Kim Ngọc		
4th Runner-Up	Đắk Lắk – Trịnh Yến Nhi		
Top 10	Đà Nẵng – Trần Thị Thoa Thương; Hà Nội – Đỗ Trần Tuệ Anh; Hà Tĩnh – Mai Trâm Anh §; Hưng Yên – Nguyễn Thị Kim Anh; Phú Thọ – Phan Cẩm Nhi		
Top 15	An Giang – Mai Bảo Hân; Cần Thơ – Nguyễn Quế Khanh; Đà Nẵng – Nguyễn Ngọc Phương Thảo; TP. Hồ Chí Minh – Hồ Thị Hoàng Huyên; TP. Hồ Chí Minh – Trương Khánh Kiều Anh; Quảng Ngãi – Lê Thị Tường Vy		
Top 20	Cà Mau – Nguyễn Huỳnh Ngọc Yến; Đà Nẵng – Nguyễn Thị Diễm Quyên; Thanh Hoá – Lê Thị Trang; Thanh Hoá – Nguyễn Dương Quỳnh		

§ - Voted into the Top 10 by viewers

== Background ==
The competition organizers announced that the Lê Hoàng Phương would serve as the Grand Executive Director. Đặng Trọng Minh Châu, Ivan Trần and Phạm Sĩ Toàn, Huỳnh Bảo Toàn as mentors of The Grand National Costume. Tuấn Bi Trần as stage director, Cindy Nguyễn as fashion director, Phan Phương Oanh as catwalk trainer, Nguyễn Hưng Phúc as catwalk director and Khoa Nguyễn as choreographer.

During the preliminary round on June 19th, the competition officially announced that the LaChateau Hotel in Ho Chi Minh City would be the venue for the final night. This is the second time the hotel has hosted the competition, following the first one in 2024. The competition did not include the Grand Crown Design segment like the previous three seasons. Instead, the Spring Spirits crown of Miss Grand Vietnam 2024 was to be reused, as will the tiaras of the runners-up.

== Additional exam ==
=== Best Grand Arrival ===
The 31 most outstanding candidates went through anthropometric measurements, Grand Arrival tests, and direct interviews with the judging panel to advance to the National Finals.

The judges for both the preliminary round and the Grand Arrival round are: Phạm Kim Dung, Hoàng Nhật Nam, Lê Hoàng Phương, Đoàn Thiên Ân, Nguyễn Hương Giang, Cao Hoàn, Nhật Kim Anh and the four current runners-up from the previous year's competition. Nguyễn Thị Yến Nhi as host.

Position	Delegate
Winner	Hồ Thị Hoàng Huyên - SBD 178
Top 10	Nguyễn Thị Kim Anh – SBD 578 Đỗ Trần Tuệ Anh – SBD 102 Võ Đoàn Bảo Hà – SBD 145 Mai Bảo Hân – SBD 168 Huỳnh Thị Ngọc Hân – SBD 273 Nguyễn Ngọc Phi Khanh – SBD 399 Phan Lê Kim Ngọc – SBD 303 Phan Cẩm Nhi – SBD 224 Trịnh Yến Nhi – SBD 369

=== Grand Talent Award ===
The winners of the Grand Talent Award automaticcaly qualified for the Top 20.

Position	Delegates
Winner	Phan Cẩm Nhi - SBD 224; Nguyễn Quế Khanh - SDB 678

=== Grand Fashion Award ===
Kết quả	Thí sinh
Chiến thắng	Nguyễn Thị Diễm Quyên - SBD 010

=== Best In Swimsuit ===
Two winners of the Best In Swimsuit award, one by the panel of judges and another one by the public vote, automatically qualified for the top 20 finalists.

Position	Delegates
Winner (by judges)	Trịnh Yến Nhi - SBD 369

=== Grand Business Award ===
The winner of the Grand Business Award automatically qualified for the Top 15.

Position	Delegate
Winner	Emoura Phạm – SBD 106
Top 10	Nguyễn Dương Quỳnh – SBD 019 Đinh Kim Chi – SBD 027 Nguyễn Thị Kim Anh – SBD 578 Nguyễn Thị Kim Chi – SBD 311 Phan Nguyễn Đào Nguyên – SBD 108 Phùng Thị Thiên Thảo – SBD 268 Mai Trâm Anh – SBD 036 Vũ Hoàng Uyên – SBD 153 Đỗ Trần Tuệ Anh – SBD 102

== Judges ==
- Đoàn Thiên Ân – Miss Grand Vietnam 2022 and top 20 of Miss Grand International 2022.
- Nguyễn Hương Giang – Miss International Queen 2018 and 2nd runner-up of MGI All Stars 1st Edition.
- Nguyễn Cao Kỳ Duyên – Miss Vietnam 2014, Miss Universe Vietnam 2024 and top 30 of Miss Universe 2024.
- Lê Hoàng Phương – Miss Grand Vietnam 2023 and 4th runner-up of Miss Grand International 2023.
- Quốc Trường – Actor and businessman.
- Nhật Kim Anh – Actor, singer and businesswoman.
- Cao Thị Hoàn – Businesswoman.

== Contestants ==
30 delegates have been confirmed to participate.

Contestants	Province
Nguyễn Thị Kim Anh	Hưng Yên
Đỗ Trần Tuệ Anh	Hà Nội
Trương Khánh Kiều Anh	Hồ Chí Minh City
Mai Trâm Anh	Hà Tĩnh
Nguyễn Thị Kim Chi	Hà Nội
Đinh Kim Chi	Hưng Yên
Emoura Phạm	Hồ Chí Minh City
Võ Đoàn Bảo Hà	Đồng Nai
Huỳnh Thị Ngọc Hân	Cần Thơ
Mai Bảo Hân	An Giang
Hồ Thị Hoàng Huyên	Hồ Chí Minh City
Nguyễn Quế Khanh	Cần Thơ
Nguyễn Ngọc Phi Khanh	Hồ Chí Minh City
Nguyễn Ngọc Thảo My	Hồ Chí Minh City
Hà Lê Quỳnh Nga	Đồng Nai
Phan Lê Kim Ngọc	Cần Thơ
Ngô Bảo Ngọc	Hồ Chí Minh City
Phan Nguyễn Đào Nguyên	Huế
Trịnh Yến Nhi	Đắk Lắk
Phan Cẩm Nhi	Phú Thọ
Phạm Hoàng Oanh	Hồ Chí Minh City
Nguyễn Thị Diễm Quyên	Đà Nẵng
Nguyễn Dương Quỳnh	Thanh Hóa
Nguyễn Ngọc Phương Thảo	Đà Nẵng
Phùng Thị Thiên Thảo	Hồ Chí Minh City
Trần Thị Thoa Thương	Đà Nẵng
Lê Thị Trang	Thanh Hoá
Vũ Hoàng Uyên	Đắk Lắk
Lê Thị Tường Vy	Quảng Ngãi
Nguyễn Huỳnh Ngọc Yến	Cà Mau
