= Miss Grand Vietnam 2024 =

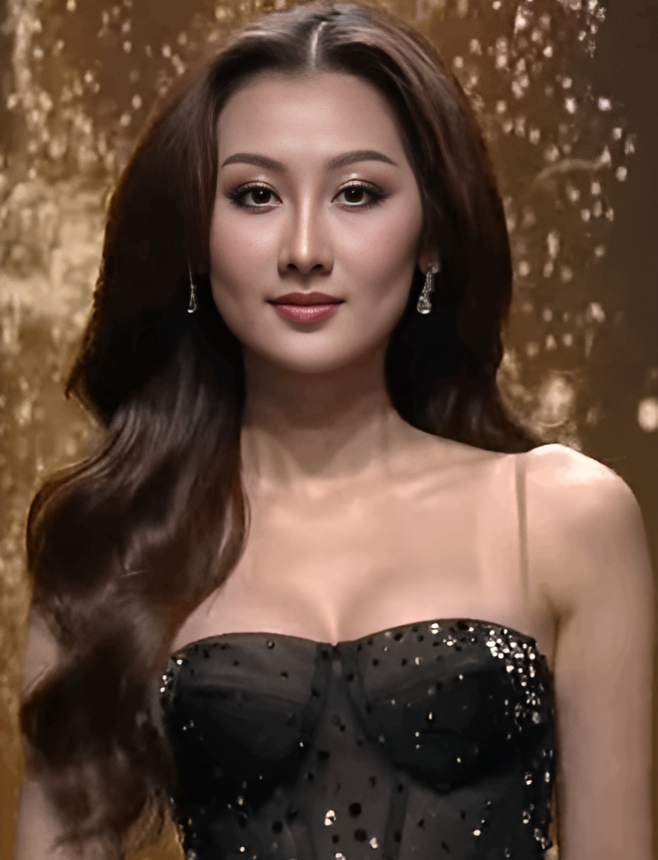
- Võ Lê Quế Anh, the winner of the contest
- Date: August 3, 2024
- Presenters: Thiên Vũ; Lương Thùy Linh
- Venue: NovaWorld Phan Thiết, Phan Thiết, Bình Thuận
- Broadcaster: YouTube; Facebook Live
- Entrants: 40
- Placements: 20
- Winner: Võ Lê Quế Anh; Quảng Nam
- Best National Costume: Khảm Xà Cừ – Nguyễn Ngọc Tứ

Miss Grand Vietnam 2024 was the 3rd edition of the Miss Grand Vietnam pageant, held on August 3, 2024, at the NovaWorld Phan Thiết in Bình Thuận, Việt Nam. Thirty-six contestants competed for the title. Võ Lê Quế Anh, a 23-year-old freelance artist representing Quảng Nam, was named the winner and crowned by Miss Grand Vietnam 2023, Lê Hoàng Phương of Khánh Hòa. She represented Vietnam at Miss Grand International 2024 but she did not make the Top 20.

The judging panel for the final included prominent figures such as Miss Vietnam 1992 Hà Kiều Anh as chief judge, artist Vương Duy Biên, Miss Grand International 2021 Nguyễn Thúc Thùy Tiên, Miss Grand Vietnam 2022 Đoàn Thiên Ân, supermodel Nguyễn Minh Tú, actor Quốc Trường, and designer Đỗ Long.

The event was broadcast to the audience worldwide via the organizer's YouTube channel and was hosted by two television personalities Thiên Vũ and Lương Thùy Linh.

== Results summary ==
=== Placements ===
Color keys

- Declared as the winner in an International pageant.
- Ended as Runner-up in an International pageant.
- Ended as finalist or semifinalist in an International pageant.
- Unplaced.

Miss Grand Vietnam 2024 competition result
| Final results | Delegate | International pageant | Miss Grand Vietnam 2024 competition result by province: Winner / Top 10; 1st runner-up / Top 15; 2nd runner-up / Top 20; 3rd runner-up / Unplaced; 4th runner-up / No representative |
| Miss Grand Vietnam 2024 | Quảng Nam - Võ Lê Quế Anh | Unplaced – Miss Grand International 2024 | Miss Grand Vietnam 2024 competition result by province: Winner / Top 10; 1st runner-up / Top 15; 2nd runner-up / Top 20; 3rd runner-up / Unplaced; 4th runner-up / No representative |
| 1st Runner-up | Đồng Tháp - Lê Phan Hạnh Nguyên | | Miss Grand Vietnam 2024 competition result by province: Winner / Top 10; 1st runner-up / Top 15; 2nd runner-up / Top 20; 3rd runner-up / Unplaced; 4th runner-up / No representative |
| 2nd Runner-up | Hanoi - Vũ Thị Thu Hiền (§) | | Miss Grand Vietnam 2024 competition result by province: Winner / Top 10; 1st runner-up / Top 15; 2nd runner-up / Top 20; 3rd runner-up / Unplaced; 4th runner-up / No representative |
| 3rd Runner-up | An Giang - Lâm Thị Bích Tuyền | | Miss Grand Vietnam 2024 competition result by province: Winner / Top 10; 1st runner-up / Top 15; 2nd runner-up / Top 20; 3rd runner-up / Unplaced; 4th runner-up / No representative |
| 4th Runner-up | Bình Thuận - Phạm Thị Ánh Vương | | Miss Grand Vietnam 2024 competition result by province: Winner / Top 10; 1st runner-up / Top 15; 2nd runner-up / Top 20; 3rd runner-up / Unplaced; 4th runner-up / No representative |
| Top 10 | Hanoi - Dương Thị Hải My (¥); Sóc Trăng - Nguyễn Phạm Thiên Kim (‡); Ninh Bình - Nguyễn Đặng Huyền Trang; Hanoi - Khuất Nguyễn Bảo Châu; Long An – Trần Hồng Ngọc (£) | | Miss Grand Vietnam 2024 competition result by province: Winner / Top 10; 1st runner-up / Top 15; 2nd runner-up / Top 20; 3rd runner-up / Unplaced; 4th runner-up / No representative |
| Top 15 | Phú Yên – Nguyễn Thị Yến Nhi; Hanoi - Phạm Liên Anh; Quảng Nam - Trần Thị Thùy Trâm; Đồng Nai - Phạm Hoàng Kim Dung; Hanoi - Kim Tú Bình; An Giang - Bùi Lý Thiên Hương; Tiền Giang - Nguyễn Thị Lệ Nam | | Miss Grand Vietnam 2024 competition result by province: Winner / Top 10; 1st runner-up / Top 15; 2nd runner-up / Top 20; 3rd runner-up / Unplaced; 4th runner-up / No representative |
| Top 20 | Ho Chi Minh City – Nguyễn Thị Hương Lan ∆; Ho Chi Minh City - Nguyễn Vĩnh Hà Phương; Hải Phòng - Đặng Trần Thủy Tiên; Thái Nguyên - Dương Thị Phương Anh; Trà Vinh - Nguyễn Thị Thu Cúc | | Miss Grand Vietnam 2024 competition result by province: Winner / Top 10; 1st runner-up / Top 15; 2nd runner-up / Top 20; 3rd runner-up / Unplaced; 4th runner-up / No representative |

- (¥) – placed into the Top 10 by Miss Popular Vote
- (§) – placed into the Top 10 by Grand Voice Award
- (‡) – placed into the Top 10 by Best Seller Award
- (£) – placed into the Top 20 by Best in Swimsuit
- (∆) – placed into the Top 20 by Best in Swimsuit by Fan Vote

=== Special awards ===
| Award | Candidate |
|---|---|
| Best Peace Presentation | 296 – Khuất Nguyễn Bảo Châu |
| Miss Popular Vote | 150 – Dương Thị Hải My |
| Best Catwalk | 456 – Trần Thị Thùy Trâm |
| Best in Evening Gown | 068 – Bùi Lý Thiên Hương |
| Best in Swimsuit by Fan Vote | 350 – Nguyễn Thị Hương Lan |
| Best Introduction | 208 – Nguyễn Vĩnh Hà Phương |
| Best Design Team Award | Nguyễn Việt Hùng's Team |
Best Profile Picture
| Winner | 192 – Nguyễn Thị Thảo |
| Top 3 | 214 – Trần Hồng Ngọc; 113 – Phạm Hoàng Kim Dung |
Top 6 Before Arrival
| Winners | 150 – Dương Thị Hải My; 144 – Nguyễn Phạm Thiên Kim; 211 – Võ Lê Quế Anh; 241 – Trần Hồng Ngọc; 367 – Dương Thị Thanh Thảo; 350 – Nguyễn Thị Hương Lan |
Miss Fashion
| Winner | 123 – Nguyễn Đặng Huyền Trang |
| Top 5 | 456 – Trần Thị Thùy Trâm; 268 – Lê Phan Hạnh Nguyên; 193 – Nguyễn Thị Yến Nhi; 284 – Phạm Thị Ánh Vương |
Best in Swimsuit
| Winner | |
| Top 5 | 268 – Lê Phan Hạnh Nguyên; 123 – Nguyễn Đặng Huyền Trang; 068 – Bùi Lý Thiên Hương; 241 – Trần Hồng Ngọc; 065 – Nguyễn Thị Lệ Nam |
Best Introduction Video
| Winner | 051 - Lâm Thị Bích Tuyền |
| Top 10 | 296 – Khuất Nguyễn Bảo Châu; 068 – Bùi Lý Thiên Hương; 268 – Lê Phan Hạnh Nguyên; 182 – Trần Thị Thanh Thanh; 003 – Đặng Trần Thủy Tiên; 051 – Lâm Thị Bích Tuyền; 278 – Cao Thị Liên; 015 – Nguyên Thị Thu Cúc; 150 – Dương Thị Hải My; 404 – Phạm Liên Anh |

| Award | Candidate |
|---|---|
Best Seller Award
| Winner | 144 – Nguyễn Phạm Thiên Kim |
| Top 5 | 241 – Trần Hồng Ngọc; 278 – Cao Thị Liên; 068 – Bùi Lý Thiên Hương; 433 – Kim Tú Bình |
Grand Voice Award
| Winner | 421 – Vũ Thị Thu Hiền |
| Top 5 | 208 – Nguyễn Vĩnh Hà Phương; 193 – Nguyễn Thị Yến Nhi; 421 – Vũ Thị Thu Hiền; 211 – Võ Lê Quế Anh; 367 – Dương Thị Thanh Thảo |
Miss Elasten
| Winner | 421 – Vũ Thị Thu Hiền |
| Top 3 | 268 – Lê Phan Hạnh Nguyên; 123 – Nguyễn Đặng Huyền Trang |
| Top 8 | 068 – Bùi Lý Thiên Hương; 241 – Trần Hồng Ngọc; 051 – Lâm Thị Bích Tuyền; 208 – Nguyễn Vĩnh Hà Phương; 365 – Trần Nguyễn Hương Trà |
| Top 18 | 404 – Phạm Liên Anh; 433 – Kim Tú Bình; 150 – Dương Thị Hải My; 121 – Hồ Thị Hoàng Huyên; 305 – Nguyễn Thị Hương Lan; 065 – Nguyễn Thị Lệ Nam; 010 – Trần Hồng Anh; 296 – Khuất Nguyễn Bảo Châu; 113 – Phạm Hoàng Kim Dung; 117 – Nguyễn Thị Minh Thương |
The Best Face of Parasola
| Winner | 241 – Trần Hồng Ngọc |
| Top 2 | 211 – Võ Lê Quế Anh |
| Top 3 | 150 – Dương Thị Hải My |

==== Best National Costume ====
| Result | National Costume | Performer | Designer |
| Winner | Khảm xà cừ | Lương Thùy Linh (Miss World Vietnam 2019) | Nguyễn Ngọc Tứ |
| 1st Runner-up | Lụa Nàng Sen | Huỳnh Thị Thanh Thủy (Miss Vietnam 2022) | Bùi Công Thiên Bảo |
| 2nd Runner-up | Thiên Hạc | Nguyễn Lê Ngọc Thảo (2nd Runner-up Miss Vietnam 2020) | Lê Thị Kim Dung |
| Best National Costume (People's Choice) | Điện gió Bạc Liêu | 211 – Võ Lê Quế Anh | Phạm Hoàng Bảo |
| Best National Costume Performance | Hoa trên chiến trận; Diệu Vũ Bài Bông; Sênh Tiền Du Hí | 113 – Phạm Hoàng Kim Dung; 203 – Nguyễn Quế Khanh; 305 – Nguyễn Thị Hương Lan | Nguyễn Minh Triết; Bùi Thế Bảo & Nguyễn Nguyên Bảo; Trần Hoài Thuận |
| Symphony of Vietnam | Huyền Sử Âu Lạc | 433 – Kim Tú Bình | Nguyễn Quốc Đạt |
| Inspirational Story of Designer | Ngọc Sen Vàng | 165 – Phan Thị Ngọc Kiều | Bùi Minh Vương |
| Inspirational Costume | Thạch Long Họa Khắc | 065 – Nguyễn Thị Lệ Nam | Ngô Hải Đăng |
| Youngest Designer | Điện gió Bạc Liêu | 211 – Võ Lê Quế Anh | Phạm Hoàng Bảo |

== Contestants ==
36 delegates have been confirmed to participate.

| Contestants | Year of Birth | Height | Province | Placement |
|---|---|---|---|---|
| Đặng Trần Thủy Tiên | 2000 | | Haiphong | |
| Trần Hồng Anh | 2003 | | Hanoi | |
| Nguyễn Thị Thu Cúc | 1998 | 1.75 m (5 ft 9 in) | Trà Vinh | |
| Lâm Thị Bích Tuyền | 1999 | 1.70 m (5 ft 7 in) | An Giang | |
| Nguyễn Thị Lệ Nam | 1996 | 1.75 m (5 ft 9 in) | Tiền Giang | |
| Bùi Lý Thiên Hương | 1996 | 1.73 m (5 ft 8 in) | An Giang | |
| Lê Thị Ngọc Ánh | 2002 | | Thừa Thiên Huế | |
| Phạm Hoàng Kim Dung | 1997 | 1.69 m (5 ft 6 1/2 in) | Đồng Nai | |
| Nguyễn Thị Minh Thương | 2003 | | Bình Phước | |
| Hồ Thị Hoàng Huyên | 2003 | | Sóc Trăng | |
| Nguyễn Đặng Huyền Trang | 1997 | | Ninh Bình | |
| Nguyễn Phạm Thiên Kim | 2005 | | Sóc Trăng | |
| Dương Thị Hải My | 2005 | | Hanoi | |
| Đinh Thị Hợp | 2001 | | Ninh Thuận | |
| Phan Thị Ngọc Kiều | 1999 | | Khánh Hòa | |
| Trần Thị Thanh Thanh | 2002 | 1.70 m (5 ft 7 in) | Bắc Giang | |
| Nguyễn Thị Yến Nhi | 2004 | 1.73 m (5 ft 8 in) | Phú Yên | |
| Nguyễn Quế Khanh | 2006 | | Cần Thơ | |
| Nguyễn Vĩnh Hà Phương | 2003 | 1.69 m (5 ft 6 1/2 in) | Ho Chi Minh City | |
| Võ Lê Quế Anh | 2001 | | Quảng Nam | |
| Tô Ánh Minh | 2000 | | Ho Chi Minh City | |
| Trần Hồng Ngọc | 2001 | 1.73 m (5 ft 8 in) | Long An | |
| Lê Phan Hạnh Nguyên | 1997 | 1.72 m (5 ft 7 1/2 in) | Đồng Tháp | |
| Cao Thị Liên | 1999 | | Thái Bình | |
| Phạm Thị Ánh Vương | 2002 | 1.73 m (5 ft 8 in) | Bình Thuận | |
| Khuất Nguyễn Bảo Châu | 2004 | | Hanoi | |
| Trịnh Mỹ Anh | 2003 | | Hanoi | |
| Dương Thị Phương Anh | 1999 | | Thái Nguyên | |
| Nguyễn Thị Hương Lan | 2003 | | Ho Chi Minh City | |
| Vũ Thị Kiều Trinh | 2000 | | Nam Định | |
| Trần Nguyễn Hương Trà | 1997 | | Khánh Hòa | |
| Dương Thị Thanh Thảo | 2002 | 1.69 m (5 ft 6 1/2 in) | Đắk Lắk | |
| Phạm Liên Anh | 2003 | 1.68 m (5 ft 6 in) | Hanoi | |
| Vũ Thị Thu Hiền | 1997 | | Hanoi | |
| Kim Tú Bình | 1999 | | Hanoi | |
| Trần Thị Thùy Trâm | 1996 | 1.68 m (5 ft 6 in) | Quảng Nam | |

== Screening judges ==
- Hà Kiều Anh – Miss Vietnam 1992, Jury president
- Nguyễn Thúc Thùy Tiên – Miss Grand International 2021 from Vietnam
- Nguyễn Minh Tú – Silver award Supermodel Vietnam 2013, Miss Supranational Asia 2018
- Đoàn Thiên Ân – Miss Grand Vietnam 2022
- Lê Hoàng Phương – Miss Grand Vietnam 2023 and the fourth runner-up Miss Grand International 2023
- Quốc Trường – Actor
- Vương Duy Biên – Vice President of the Vietnam Union of Literature and Arts Associations – Course X
