= Miss Grand Turkey =

Turkish beauty pageant title

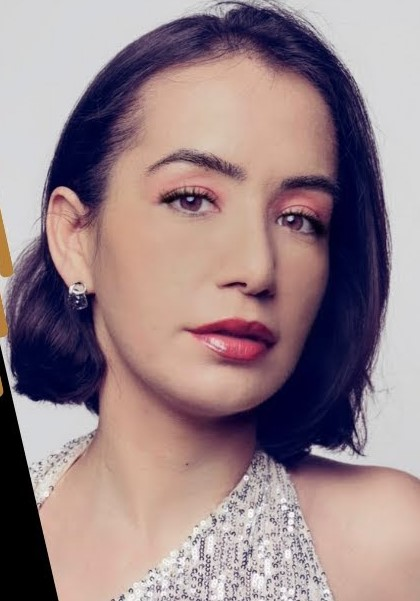
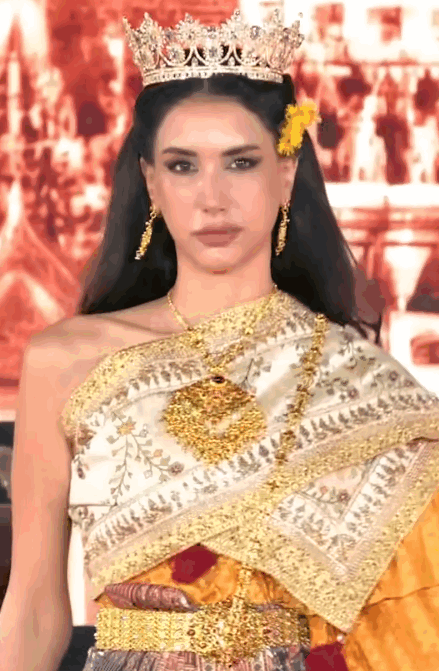
- Deria Koc, Miss Grand Turkey 2022 İlayda Anık, Miss Grand Turkey 2025
- Formation: 2016
- Type: Beauty pageant
- Headquarters: Istanbul
- Location: Turkey
- Members: Miss Grand International
- Official language: Turkish; English
- National director: Shakir Sela (2025)
- Parent organization: Miss Universe Turkiye (2025); Özcan Yılmaz Agency Model (2022–2023)

Miss Grand Turkey is a female beauty pageant title awarded to Turkish representatives competing at the Miss Grand International pageant. The title was first awarded in 2016 when a Ukrainian-Turkish fashion model and singer from Cherkasy, Diana Birgen (Osypenko), was appointed as a Turkish candidate for Miss Grand International 2016, held in Las Vegas, United States.

Since the establishment of Miss Grand International in 2013, Turkey participated three times: in 2016, 2022, and 2023; however, all of its representatives were unplaced.

== History ==
Turkey participated in Miss Grand International for the first time in 2016 when a Ukrainian fashion model and singer from Cherkasy, Diana Birgen (Osypenko), was nominated by Miss Grand International beauty pageant management as a Turkish representative in the international competition held in Las Vegas, United States;. Nowadays Diana Birgen (Osypenko) is the president of the Aegean Ukrainians Association (Turkish: Ege Ukraynalılar Derneği), which supports Ukrainian residents in the Aegean region as well as promotes Ukrainian traditions among the Ukrainian community on the Aegean coast.

After five consecutive years of absence, the franchise was then purchased in 2022 by an Istanbul-based model agency, Özcan Yılmaz Agency Model, and a Turkish German social activist who was also the finalist of Miss Grand Germany 2022, Deria Koc, was assigned as a Turkish representative for Miss Grand International 2022 in Indonesia, but she was unplaced .

== International competition ==
The following is a list of Turkish representatives at the Miss Grand International contest.

Year	Representative	Original national title	Competition result	National director
2016	Diana Osypenko	Appointed	Unplaced	Anastasiia Lenna
No representatives from 2017 to 2021
2022	Deria Koc	Miss From Germany 2022 Finalist	Unplaced	Özcan Yılmaz
2023	Beyhan Kübra	Appointed	Unplaced	Özcan Yılmaz
2024	No representative			
2025	Ilayda Anik	1st runner-up Miss Universe Turkiye 2024	Unplaced	Shakir Sela
