= Irvine Valley College =

Community college in Irvine, California, US

- Motto: A posse ad esse (Latin)
- Motto in English: From possibility to actuality
- Type: Public community college
- Established: 1985; 41 years ago
- President: John C. Hernandez
- Faculty: 94 full-time, 250 part-time
- Students: 12,812 (2019)
- Location: Irvine, California, United States; 33°40′36″N 117°46′40″W
- Colors: Blue and white
- Mascot: Laser
- Website: ivc.edu

Irvine Valley College (also known as IVC or Irvine Valley) is a public community college in Irvine, California. It is part of the California Community Colleges system. The college inherited its name from the Irvine family and the Irvine Company that were key in the development of the city of Irvine. Opened in 1979 as Saddleback College North Campus, Irvine Valley College received its current name and independent status in July 1985 by the South Orange County Community College District. In July 1988, the college received its first accreditation as a separate institution by the Accrediting Commission for Community and Junior Colleges (then the Western Association of Schools and Colleges). The school provides associate of art and science degrees, certificates of achievement, and lower-division transferable courses to other colleges and universities. It enrolls nearly 13,000 students.

== Athletics ==
Irvine Valley College athletics teams are known as the Lasers and have a rivalry with their district rivals at Saddleback College, with whom they compete for a perpetual trophy called The Irons. IVC sponsors intercollegiate athletics competition in 13 sports: women's badminton, men's baseball, men's and women' basketball, men's and women's golf, men's and women's soccer, men's and women's tennis, men's and women's volleyball and women's sand volleyball. IVC is a member of the Orange Empire Conference with the exception of men's volleyball (which participates as part of the Pacific Coast Athletic Conference), and women's sand volleyball (which plays as an independent and was the first community college in the nation to sponsor the sport at the two-year level).

Irvine Valley men's soccer team has twice been named national champions among small colleges (1993 and 2003) for coach Martin McGrogan, and men's volleyball four times (1994, 2007, 2008 and 2011) among IVC Athletics' total of 17 state titles since the program's inception in 1993. The total includes IVC's most recent titles in women's golf in 2012 under Coach Ben Burnett, and the first-ever state championship in women's sand volleyball under Coach Tom Pestolesi in 2013.

Badminton set a state record with four consecutive women's state badminton championships from 2002 to 2005 in addition to their latest state titles in 2009 and 2011, while men's volleyball team was the latest to capture back-to-back titles, winning State and National Championships under the direction of Pestolesi in 2007 and 2008. Misty May-Treanor is a consultant for the IVC volleyball teams.

IVC Athletics' three state championships in 2010–11 represented the first time a non-football school had accomplished the feat in state history.

== Irvine Valley College Television ==
IVCTV33 airs educational and promotional videos of Irvine Valley College. IVCTV33 began airing in 1999 and may be seen on channel 33 via Cox cable or online.

== Notable people ==
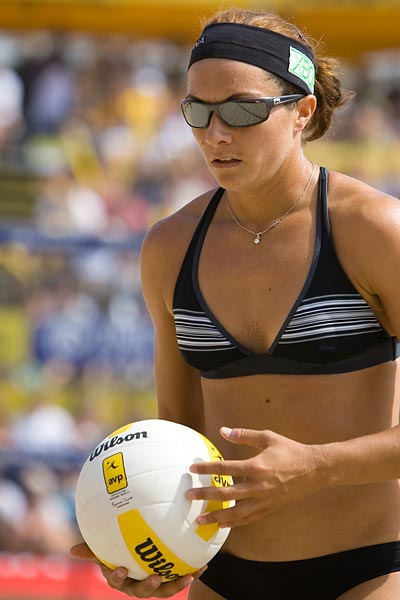
Misty May-Treanor, coaching faculty, multiple gold medal-winning Olympic beach volleyball player

=== Faculty ===
- Misty May-Treanor, Olympic beach volleyball gold medalist, and assistant coach for IVC's women's volleyball team.

=== Alumni ===
- Roberto Linck former player of Major League Soccer and executive producer of the film Buddy.
- Lauren Potter, actress known for the TV series Glee
- Christie Repasy, floral artist
- Brett Young, country music star
- Emoura Phạm, Miss Grand Vietnam 2026
