= Miss Grand Kyrgyzstan =

Kyrgyz beauty pageant title

- Formation: 2014
- Type: Beauty pageant
- Headquarters: Kyrgyzstan
- Location: Bishkek
- Members: Miss Grand International
- Official language: Kyrgyz; Russian
- Director: Ryskul Namazbekova
- Parent organization: IDOL Fashion Management (2014); Glam Shot (2022); R Events (2025)

Miss Grand Kyrgyzstan is a national beauty pageant title awarded to Kyrgyz representatives who were elected to compete at the Miss Grand International pageant. The title was first awarded in 2014 to Samudinova Nurzhamal, and then to Jamilya Jyrgalbekova in 2021, as the supplemental titles in the Miss Kyrgyzstan pageants.

In 2013–2014, the license of Miss Grand Kyrgyzstan belonged to IDOL Fashion Management. Meanwhile, the 2022 license was purchased by the organizer of Miss Kyrgyzstan, the Glam Shot.

== History ==
Kyrgyzstan was originally expected to make its debut in the Miss Grand International pageant in 2014 when Samudinova Nurzhamal was elected Miss Grand Kyrgyzstan after participating at the Miss Kyrgyzstan 2014 pageant held at the Malakhitovom Hall in the Kyrgyz Opera and Ballet Theater in Bishkek on September 6, 2014. However, Samudinova did not enter the international tournament in Thailand for undisclosed reasons.

Later in November 2021, the title of Miss Grand Kyrgyzstan was awarded to the first vice-miss of the Miss Kyrgyzstan 2021 pageant, in which the titleholder, Jamilya Jyrgalbekova, was set to partake at the Miss Grand International 2022 pageant in Indonesia, but withdrew due to the increase in flight prices caused by the 2022 Russo-Ukrainian wars.

Gallery

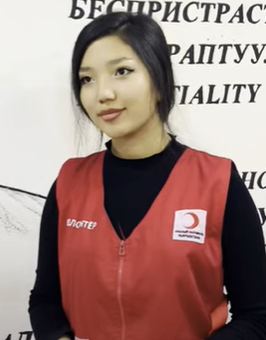
Jamilya Jyrgalbekova
(2022)

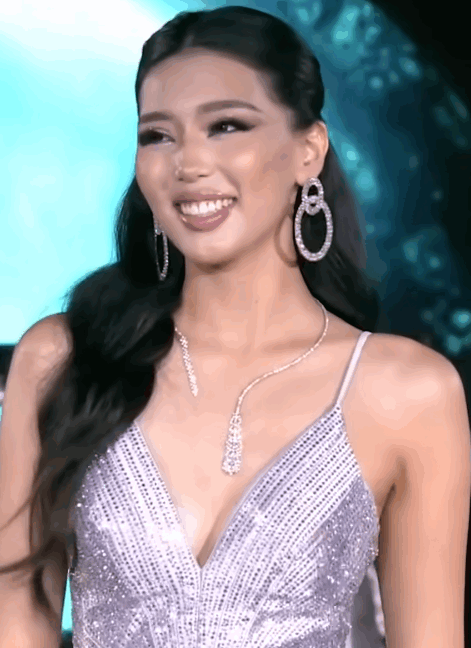
Medina Ermekova
(2025)

== International competition ==
The following is a list of Kyrgyzstan representatives at the Miss Grand International contest.

Year	Representative	Original national title	Result		National director
Year	Representative	Original national title	Placement	Other awards	National director
2014	Samudinova Nurzhamal	Miss Grand Kyrgyzstan 2014 (Note: Supplemental title at the Miss Kyrgyzstan 2014 pageant.)	Did not compete		Usen Berdibaev
2022	Jamilya Jyrgalbekova	Miss Grand Kyrgyzstan 2022 (Note: Supplemental title at the Miss Kyrgyzstan 2021 pageant.)	Did not compete		Unknown
No representatives from 2023 to 2024
2025	Ermekova Medina	Miss Grand Kyrgyzstan 2025 (Note: Supplemental title at the Miss Kyrgyzstan 2025 pageant.)	Unplaced	Runner-up Grand Talent	Ryskul Namazbekova
2026	Rufina Gasanova	Queen of Kyrgyzstan 2025 (Note: Special title at the Miss Kyrgyzstan 2025 pageant.)			Ryskul Namazbekova
