= Miss Grand International 2025 =

13th Miss Grand International competition, beauty pageant

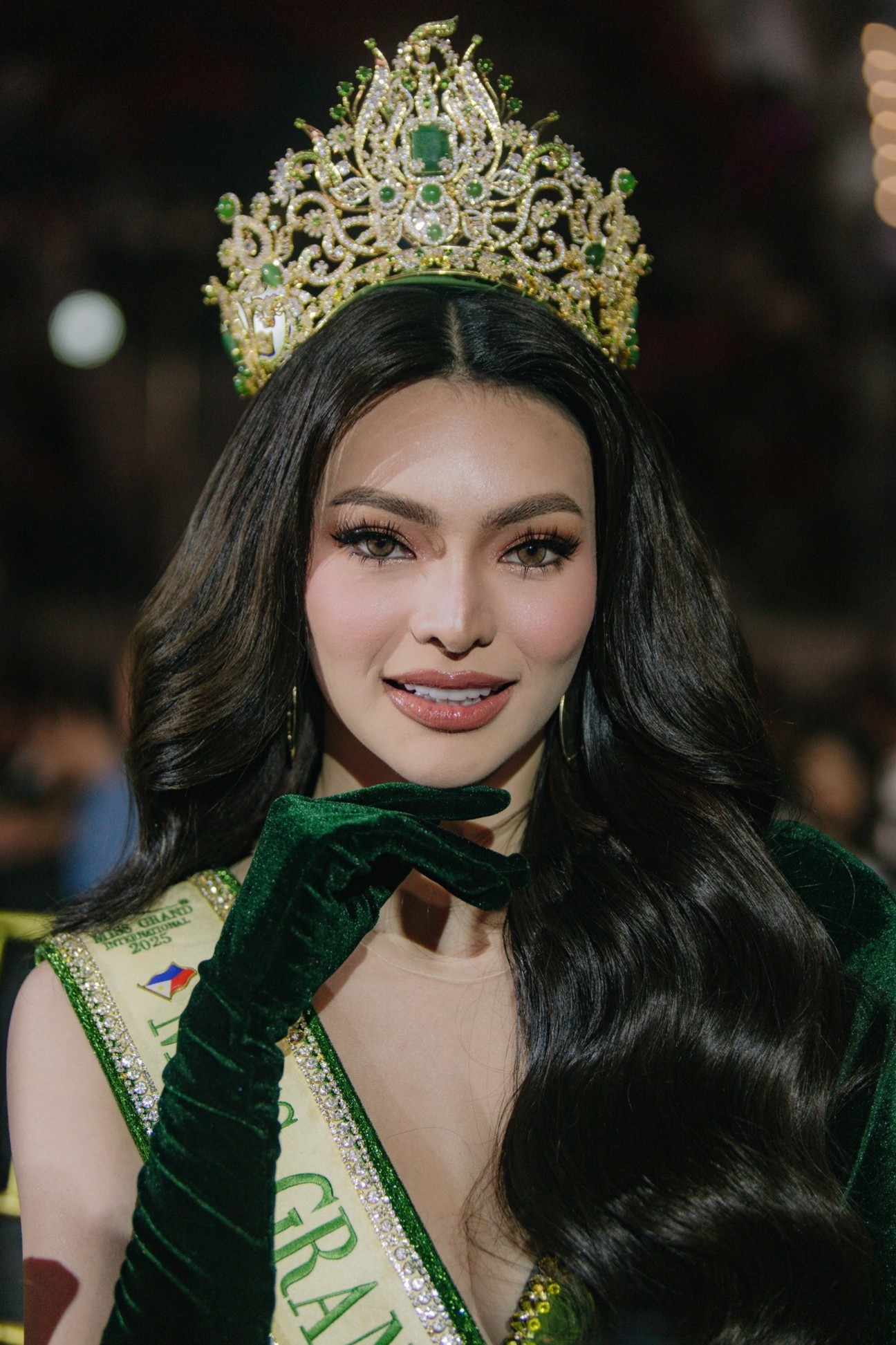
- Emma Tiglao
- Date: 18 October 2025
- Presenters: Matthew Deane
- Entertainment: Engfa Waraha; Pitchapa Justice; Kanlayawan Phet-in
- Venue: MGI Hall, Bangkok, Thailand
- Broadcaster: YouTube
- Entrants: 77
- Placements: 22
- Debuts: Iceland; Kyrgyzstan; Martinique; Montenegro; Palestine
- Withdrawals: Bangladesh; Cameroon; Chile; Côte d'Ivoire; Curaçao; Gibraltar; Greenland; Honduras; Pakistan; Poland; Russia; Switzerland
- Returns: Costa Rica; Georgia; Guyana; Hong Kong; Hungary; Jamaica; Kazakhstan; Malta; North Macedonia; Portugal; Slovakia; Sri Lanka; Sweden; Turkey; Zambia; Zimbabwe
- Winner: Emma Tiglao; Philippines
- Best National Costume: Kaliana Diniz (Brazil); Vishakha Kanwar (India); Sarunrat Puagpipat (Thailand)
- Best in Swimsuit: Sarunrat Puagpipat (Thailand)
- Best in Evening Gown: Montserrat Villalva (Mexico)

External videos
- Grand final
- Preliminary competition

Miss Grand International 2025 was the 13th Miss Grand International pageant, held at the MGI Hall in Bangkok, Thailand, on 18 October 2025.

CJ Opiaza of the Philippines crowned Emma Tiglao of the Philippines as her successor at the end of the event. It was the Philippines first back-to-back win at Miss Grand International.

Contestants from seventy-seven countries and territories competed. The competition was transmitted on the pageant's YouTube channel, GrandTV, and was hosted by Matthew Deane. Miss Grand Thailand 2022, Engfa Waraha, Pitchapa Justice, and Kanlayawan Phet-in performed.

== Background ==
=== Location and date ===
Nawat Itsaragrisil, president of the Miss Grand International Organization, said in August 2022 that the host country for had already been chosen, but due to contractual obligations, would wait to announce it.

On 18 November 2024, it was announced that Thailand would host the pageant for the second year. The main venue will be the MGI Hall in Bangkok, with pre-pageant events in Hua Hin, Prachuap Khiri Khan province. The grand final will take place on 18 October 2025.

=== Selection of participants ===
Contestants from seventy-seven countries and territories were selected to compete in the pageant. Thirty-three of these contestant were appointed to the position after being runners-up in their national pageant, or being chosen through a casting process, and two replaced a removed winner.

On June 5, 2025, the Miss Grand International Organization announced new eligibility rules for contestants, starting with the 2025 contest. The new rules state that contestants must be between 18 and 35 years old.

==== Replacements ====
Miss Grand Venezuela 2024, Tina Batson, resigned due to financial constraints and was replaced by Miss Grand Venezuela 2025, Nariman Battikha. Likewise, Miss Grand Trinidad and Tobago 2025, Tamara Persad, was removed for contractual reasons and replaced by the second runner-up, Monique Joseph.

==== Debuts, returns, and withdrawals ====
This contest had the debuts of Iceland, Kyrgyzstan, Martinique, Montenegro and Palestine. Additionally, and the returns of Georgia, which last competed in 2013; Zimbabwe in 2014; Guyana and North Macedonia (Macedonia) in 2015; Malta in 2016; Slovakia and Hungary in 2017; Kazakhstan and Zambia in 2018; Sweden in 2021; Jamaica, Portugal and Sri Lanka in 2022; and Costa Rica, Hong Kong and Turkey in 2023.

Emilia Dides of Chile withdrew from the competition for personal reasons, and was not replaced. Miss Grand Cameroon 2025, Theresia Mah Awageam and Miss Grand Kenya 2024, Magdalene Takangiro, withdrew from the lack of the required license for their respective national organizations to send a representative.

== Results ==
=== Placements ===
| Placement | Contestant |
|---|---|
| Miss Grand International 2025 | Philippines – Emma Tiglao ‡ |
| 1st Runner-Up | Thailand – Sarunrat Puagpipat |
| 2nd Runner-Up | Spain – Aitana Jiménez |
| 3rd Runner-Up | Ghana – Faith Maria Porter ☆ |
| 4th Runner-Up | Venezuela – Nariman Battikha |
| 5th Runners-Up | Colombia – Laura Ramos π; Czech Republic – Markéta Mörwicková; Guatemala – Ana-Sofía Lendl; Mexico – Montserrat Villalva; Tanzania – Beatrice Alex Akyoo |
| Top 22 | Belgium – Jane Baesen; Brazil – Kaliana Diniz; Dominican Republic – Madelyn Mejía; Ecuador – Samantha Quenedit; France – Elisa Mysyshyne; Indonesia – Vina Sitorus; Japan – Erika Ishibashi ☆; Laos – Sirisopha Phimmakaisone; Martinique – Axelle René; Paraguay – Cecilia Romero; United Kingdom – Harriotte Lane; United States – Ivana Garcia; Zambia – Anna Musonda |

π – Voted into the Top 10 by viewers and awarded as Miss Popular Vote.
‡ – Voted into the Top 22 by viewers and awarded as Country's Power of the Year.
☆ – Voted into the Top 22 by the judges and awarded as Grand Talent.

=== Special awards ===
| Award | Contestant |
|---|---|
| Best in Evening Gown | Mexico – Montserrat Villalva |
| Best in Swimsuit | Thailand – Sarunrat Puagpipat |
| Best National Costume | Brazil – Kaliana Diniz; India – Vishakha Kanwar; Thailand – Sarunrat Puagpipat |
| Country's Power of the Year | Philippines – Emma Tiglao |
| Grand Talent | Ghana – Faith Maria Porter; Japan – Erika Ishibashi |
| Miss Popular Vote | Colombia – Laura Ramos |

==== Sponsor awards ====
| Award | Contestant |
|---|---|
| Miss Grand InterContinental Hua Hin Resort | Venezuela – Nariman Battikha |

==== Director awards ====
| Award | Recipient |
|---|---|
| Golden Grand Award | Miss Grand Dominican Republic – Alejandro Martínez, Jorge Cruz |
| Silver Grand Awards | Miss Grand India – Sourav Anand, Akanksha Thakur; Miss Grand Myanmar – Maran Seng Naw |

== Pre-pageant events ==
=== Fan votes ===
==== Pre-arrival voting ====
On 24 September 2025, voting began on the pageant's social media by sharing photos of the contestants. These could be liked and shared, which determined the contestants' scores. The ten contestants with the highest scores attended a formal dinner with senior executives of the organization on 1 October 2025.

The ten winners of the pre-arrival voting are: Kaliana Diniz of Brazil, Samantha Quenedit of Ecuador, Ana-Sofía Lendl of Guatemala, Montserrat Villalva of Mexico, Cecilia Romero of Paraguay, Flavia López of Peru, Emma Tiglao of the Philippines, Aitana Jiménez of Spain, Sarunrat Puagpipat of Thailand, and Nariman Battikha of Venezuela.

==== Country's Power of the Year ====
Voting for Country's Power of the Year began on 8 October 2025 on the pageant's official Facebook and Instagram pages. During this round, the portraits of all contestants were shared with the public. The contestant with the most reactions will automatically be part of the Top 22 semi-finalists in the grand final on 18 October 2025.

| Placement | Contestant |
|---|---|
| Winner | Philippines – Emma Tiglao |
| Top 4 | Myanmar – Jaukang Nu San Pan; Paraguay – Cecilia Romero; Thailand – Sarunrat Puagpipat |
| Top 8 | Guatemala – Ana-Sofía Lendl; Indonesia – Vina Sitorus; Peru – Flavia López; Vietnam – Yến Nhi Nguyễn |
| Top 20 | Bolivia – Alexandra Rocha; Brazil – Kaliana Diniz; Colombia – Laura Ramos; Czech Republic – Markéta Mörwicková; Dominican Republic – Madelyn Mejía; Ecuador – Samantha Quenedit; Kosovo – Brikena Selmani; Malaysia – Viviana Lin Winston; Mexico – Montserrat Villalva; Spain – Aitana Jiménez; Tanzania – Beatrice Alex Akyoo; Venezuela – Nariman Battikha |

=== Grand Talent ===
The Grand Talent competition started with the auditions round on 3 October 2025 at the MGI Hall. Fifteen contestants passed the auditions and moved on to the final round, which took place at the same venue on 13 October 2025. From the final round, five finalists were selected, and the winner of the Grand Talent Competition will be automatically be part of the Top 22 semi-finalists.

| Placement | Contestant |
|---|---|
| Winners | Ghana – Faith Maria Porter; Japan – Erika Ishibashi |
| Runners-up | Kyrgyzstan – Medina Ermekova; Panama – Isamar Herrera; Zambia – Anna Musonda |
| Top 15 | Czech Republic – Markéta Mörwicková; Ecuador – Samantha Quenedit; Hungary – Szonja Dudik; Italy – Elisa Crocchianti; Kazakhstan – Tomiris Kadyrkhan; Laos – Sirisopha Phimmakaisone; Mexico – Montserrat Villalva; Myanmar – Jaukang Nu San Pan; Tanzania – Beatrice Alex Akyoo; Thailand – Sarunrat Puagpipat |

=== Swimsuit competition ===
The Swimsuit competition took place at the InterContinental Resort in Hua Hin, Prachuap Khiri Khan on 9 October 2025, and was livestreamed through the pageant's official YouTube channel, GrandTV. Twenty semi-finalists will be selected in this competition: ten will be selected by the judges, while the remaining ten will be decided through public voting. From the twenty, one candidate will be proclaimed as a winner and will be awarded as Best in Swimsuit during the main pageant on 18 October 2025.

| Placement | | Contestant |
|---|---|---|
| Winner | | Thailand – Sarunrat Puagpipat |
| Top 20 | Public Vote | Colombia – Laura Ramos; Ecuador – Samantha Quenedit; Guatemala – Ana-Sofía Lendl; Indonesia – Vina Sitorus; Mexico – Montserrat Villalva; Paraguay – Cecilia Romero; Peru – Flavia López; Philippines – Emma Tiglao; Vietnam – Yến Nhi Nguyễn |
| Top 20 | Judge's Choice | Australia – Gabriella Oxley; Canada – Layanna Robinson; Czech Republic – Markéta Mörwicková; Ghana – Faith Maria Porter; Italy – Elisa Crocchianti; Japan – Erika Ishibashi; Spain – Aitana Jiménez; Tanzania – Beatrice Alex Akyoo; United Kingdom – Harriotte Lane; United States – Ivana Garcia |

=== National costume competition ===
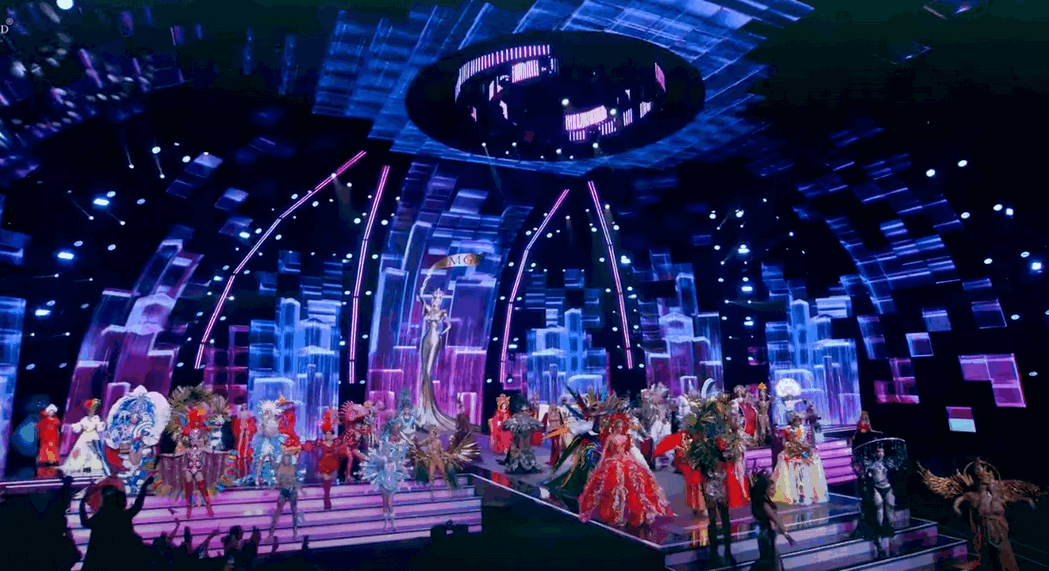
MGI Hall, Bangkok, the venue of the pageant.

The National costume Competition took place at the MGI Hall on 13 October 2025 and was livestreamed through the pageant's official YouTube channel, GrandTV. Twenty semi-finalists will be selected in this competition: ten will be selected by the judges, while the remaining ten will be decided through public voting. From the twenty, three costumes will be announced as winners during the main pageant on 18 October 2025.

| Placement | | Contestant |
|---|---|---|
| Winners | | Brazil – Kaliana Diniz; India – Vishakha Kanwar; Thailand – Sarunrat Puagpipat |
| Top 20 | Public Vote | Bolivia – Alexandra Rocha; Ecuador – Samantha Quenedit; Guatemala – Ana-Sofía Lendl; Indonesia – Vina Sitorus; Mexico – Montserrat Villalva; Myanmar – Jaukang Nu San Pan; Philippines – Emma Tiglao; Venezuela – Nariman Battikha; Vietnam – Yến Nhi Nguyễn |
| Top 20 | Judge's Choice | Egypt – Manar El Saaidy; France – Elisa Mysyshyne; Japan – Erika Ishibashi; Panama – Isamar Herrera; Trinidad and Tobago – Monique Joseph; United Kingdom – Harriotte Lane; United States – Ivana Garcia; Zambia – Anna Musonda |

== Contestants ==
Seventy-seven contestants competed for the title.

| Country/Territory | Contestant | Age (Note: Ages at the time of the pageant) | Hometown |
|---|---|---|---|
| Albania | Dajana Gjoka | 23 | Mirditë |
| Angola | Elizandra da Costa | 24 | Talatona |
| Argentina | Elena Mateo | 27 | Juan Bautista Alberdi |
| Armenia | Lilia Gzraryan | 22 | Yerevan |
| Australia | Gabriella Oxley | 25 | Gold Coast |
| Belgium | Jane Baesen | 18 | Bierges |
| Bolivia | Alexandra Rocha | 28 | Cochabamba |
| Brazil | Kaliana Diniz | 25 | Nova Floresta |
| Canada | Layanna Robinson | 23 | Victoria |
| China | Nora Xiong | 27 | Shenzhen |
| Colombia | Laura Ramos | 29 | Bogotá |
| Costa Rica | Kristel Gómez | 31 | San José |
| Cuba | Daylin Rodríguez | 20 | Isla de la Juventud |
| Czech Republic | Markéta Mörwicková | 21 | Prague |
| Denmark | Emilie Andersen | 21 | Odense |
| Dominican Republic | Madelyn Mejía | 28 | Baní |
| Ecuador | Samantha Quenedit | 25 | Quito |
| Egypt | Manar El Saaidy | 24 | Cairo |
| El Salvador | Lucianne Herrera | 19 | Colón |
| France | Elisa Mysyshyne | 25 | Paris |
| Georgia | Teona Kbilashvili | 28 | Tbilisi |
| Germany | Sadina Dudić | 27 | Sanski Most |
| Ghana | Faith Maria Porter | 26 | Bowie |
| Guatemala | Ana-Sofía Lendl | 27 | Vienna |
| Guyana | Lieve Blanckaert | 27 | Georgetown |
| Haiti | Valentchina Dantes | 27 | Artibonite |
| Hong Kong | Jo An Ma | 27 | Hong Kong |
| Hungary | Szonja Dudik | 26 | Veresegyház |
| Iceland | Brynja Mary Sverrisdóttir | 21 | Reykjavík |
| India | Vishakha Kanwar | 21 | Kota |
| Indonesia | Vina Sitorus | 26 | Medan |
| Italy | Elisa Crocchianti | 25 | Rome |
| Jamaica | Matea Mahal Smith | 23 | Kingston |
| Japan | Erika Ishibashi | 28 | Sumida |
| Kazakhstan | Tomiris Kadyrkhan | 23 | Kyzylorda |
| Kosovo | Brikena Selmani | 25 | Prizren |
| Kyrgyzstan | Medina Ermekova | 23 | Bishkek |
| Laos | Sirisopha Phimmakaisone | 26 | Champasak |
| Macau | Elena Wang | 25 | Coloane |
| Malaysia | Viviana Lin Winston | 26 | Sri Aman |
| Malta | Shailey Micallef | 23 | Floriana |
| Martinique | Axelle René | 24 | Le Robert |
| Mexico | Montserrat Villalva | 26 | Mixquiahuala |
| Montenegro | Llaura Maroviq | 18 | Ulcinj |
| Myanmar | Jaukang Nu San Pan | 22 | Namhkam |
| Nepal | Jessica Singh Thakuri | 18 | Lalitpur |
| Netherlands | Rosalie Esmee Hooft | 24 | Tiel |
| New Zealand | Gazelle Garcia | 34 | Auckland |
| Nicaragua | Daniesca Granja | 19 | Juigalpa |
| Nigeria | Joy Omachonu | 24 | Abuja |
| North Macedonia | Ilirjana Saliu | 25 | Kumanovo |
| Palestine | Yara Bishi | 24 | Ramallah |
| Panama | Isamar Herrera | 31 | Alanje |
| Paraguay | Cecilia Romero | 21 | Caazapá |
| Peru | Flavia López | 20 | Trujillo |
| Philippines | Emma Tiglao | 30 | Mabalacat |
| Portugal | Sílvia Oliveira | 27 | Aveiro |
| Puerto Rico | Sarahí Figueroa | 28 | Dorado |
| Singapore | Rose Pang | 30 | Singapore |
| Slovakia | Mária Glatzová | 29 | Prešov |
| South Africa | Boitshepo Lamola | 20 | Soshanguve |
| South Korea | Gyu-ri Kim | 27 | Gyeongbuk |
| Spain | Aitana Jiménez | 25 | Arona |
| Sri Lanka | Tishani Perera | 21 | Colombo |
| Sweden | Alexandra Timmros | 24 | Linköping |
| Taiwan | Xinya Chen | 27 | Macau |
| Tanzania | Beatrice Alex Akyoo | 25 | Dar es Salaam |
| Thailand | Sarunrat Puagpipat | 29 | Nakhon Si Thammarat |
| Trinidad and Tobago | Monique Joseph | 27 | Speyside |
| Turkey | İlayda Anık | 28 | Istanbul |
| United Kingdom | Harriotte Lane | 24 | Newcastle |
| United States | Ivana Garcia | 23 | Orlando |
| United States Virgin Islands | Giselle Burgos | 27 | Boyle Heights |
| Venezuela | Nariman Battikha | 30 | Maturín |
| Vietnam | Yến Nhi Nguyễn | 21 | Dak Lak |
| Zambia | Anna Musonda | 26 | Chongwe |
| Zimbabwe | Chelsea Mandizha | 32 | Harare |
