= Emoura Phạm =

Vietnamese and British model and beauty pageant titleholder (born 2000)

- Phạm Chấn Phương
- Emoura Pham in 2026
- Born: Turner Katherine Margaret; Thailand
- Occupation: Model
- Beauty pageant titleholder
- Title: Miss Grand Vietnam 2026
- Major competitions: Miss Grand Vietnam 2026; (Winner); Miss Grand International 2026; (4th Runner-Up)

Emoura Phạm (born 2000), also known by her Vietnamese name Phạm Chấn Phương, is a Vietnamese and British model and beauty pageant titleholder. She won Miss Grand Vietnam 2026 and is representing Vietnam at Miss Grand International 2026.

== Early life and education ==
Phạm was born Turner Katherine Margaret in Thailand in 2000. Her Vietnamese name is Phạm Chấn Phương. Her mother is Vietnamese, and her father is British of South African descent. She grew up in Vietnam and attended the British International School and The American School. At the age of 15, she moved to the United States, where she attended high school and later pursued an associate degree in arts at Irvine Valley College in California. She returned to Vietnam in 2025.

== Modeling ==
Phạm made her television debut as a contestant on Vietnam's Next Top Model in 2025 and did not reach the final. She subsequently worked as a professional model, appearing at Vietnam International Fashion Week and in fashion shows for designer Adrian Anh Tuấn.

== Pageantry ==
Phạm won Miss Grand Vietnam 2026. She won the Grand Business, and Best Presentation on Peace awards, and also reached the top six of the Grand Fashion award and the top ten of the Grand Talent competition. She won the national title on 31 July 2026, against 29 other contestants, and became Vietnam's representative for Miss Grand International 2026.

Emoura traveled to Thailand on 18 September 2026 to compete in Miss Grand International 2026. She finished first in a fan-voting round held during the opening week and was among ten contestants selected for a dinner with pageant president Nawat Itsaragrisil and Miss Grand International 2025 Emma Tiglao. On 24 September, she advanced to the top 15 of the pageant's Grand Talent competition. The final is scheduled for 10 October in Bangkok.

Awards and achievements
Preceded by Venezuela Nariman Battikha, Venezuela	4th Runner-up Miss Grand International; 2026	Incumbent
Preceded by Nguyễn Thị Yến Nhi	Miss Grand Vietnam; 2026	Incumbent
