= Mekong Delta Development Research Institute =

Vietnamese research institute

- Viện Nghiên cứu Phát triển đồng bằng sông Cửu Long
- Former names: Mekong Delta Development and Research Institute
- Established: 1976
- Director: Dang Kieu Nhan
- Location: Can Tho, Viet Nam
- Website: mdi.ctu.edu.vn/en/

The Mekong Delta Development Research Institute (MDI) (Vietnamese: Viện Nghiên cứu Phát triển đồng bằng sông Cửu Long) is an institute in Can Tho, Vietnam. Established in 1976, it is an interdisciplinary training and research organization of Can Tho University in the Mekong Delta. The main function of the institute is to train human resources for the Mekong delta in rural development and farming system. The second important activity of the institute is doing scientific research.

== Staff ==
At present, the total number of MDI staff is around 35, including 20 lecturers (04 Assoc. Profs, 07 PhDs and 09 Masters).

== Function ==
=== Education and Training ===
The current training capacity of MDI is more than 500 students involving full-time undergraduate and postgraduate students, including 2 main majors:

- Rural Development: bachelor, master and doctor degree
- Agricultural System: master's degree

In addition, MDI cooperates with local authorities to organize more than 100 training courses per year for local officials about:

- Rice producing, breeding and selecting techniques
- Farming Systems Research/Extension
- Techniques for new rural development communes
- Other techniques about livelihood assessment and value chain

=== Research ===
The Institute pays attention to the following research areas:

- Food security
- Agricultural resources management
- Rural development
- Urban development
- Climate change adaptation
- Policies and governance in agricultural and rural aspects

== Organizational structure ==
Up to now, Mekong Delta Development Research Institute (MDI) has 03 departments, 01 Center and an Administration office.

- Department of Agriculture System
- of Crop Resource Management
- Department of Socio Economic Policy Studies
- Research and Training Center for Rural professions
