= Miss Grand Uganda =

Ugandan beauty pageant title

- Formation: 2013
- Type: Beauty pageant
- Headquarters: Kampala
- Location: Uganda
- Members: Miss Grand International
- Official language: English

Miss Grand Uganda licensee timeline

Miss Grand Uganda is a national beauty pageant title awarded to Ugandan representatives competing at the Miss Grand International contest. The first titleholder was a 26-year-old model Pierra Akwero who was assigned to compete at the inaugural edition of Miss Grand International in Thailand in 2013. Since 2022, the license to send Ugandan candidates to join the mentioned international contest has belonged to the Oliver Nakakande Foundation.

Since the first competition in 2013, Ugandan representatives have never been placed in Miss Grand International.

== History ==
Uganda occasionally takes part in Miss Grand International; it debuted in 2013 and was represented by an appointed representative, Pierra Akwero; however, she was unplaced on the international stage held in Thailand. The license was transferred to different licensees each year, and all representatives were directly hand-picked; no Miss Grand National was held to determine the titleholders. Statistically, all Ugandan candidates competing at the Miss Grand International received non-placements.

== International competition ==
The following is a list of Ugandan representatives at the Miss Grand International contest.

Year	Representative	Original national title	Competition performance	National director
2013	Pierra Akwero	—N/a	Unplaced	Unknown
2015	Lilian Gashumba	—N/a	Unplaced	Maria Mutagamba
2017	Achieng Priscilla	Miss Earth Uganda 2016	Unplaced	Victoria Nabagereka
2018 – 2021: No representatives
2022	Oliver Nakakande	Miss World Uganda 2019	Unplaced	Self-dominated
2023 – Present: No representatives

== Titleholders gallery ==
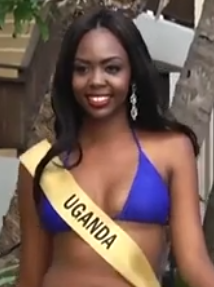
Miss Grand Uganda 2015
Lilian Gashumba

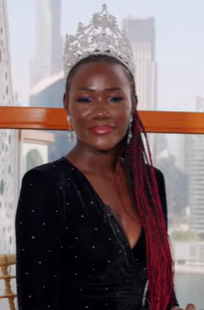
Miss Grand Uganda 2022
Oliver Nakakande
