= Miss Grand Vietnam =

Beauty pageant in Vietnam

- Hoa hậu Hòa bình Việt Nam
- Type: National beauty pageant
- Headquarters: Hồ Chí Minh City
- President: Phạm Thị Kim Dung
- Memberships: Miss Grand International; MGI All Stars
- Organization: Sen Vàng Entertainment
- Language: Vietnamese; English
- Predecessor: Nguyễn Thị Yến Nhi; Đắk Lắk
- Successor: Emoura Phạm; Hồ Chí Minh City
- Website: missgrandvietnam.com.vn

Miss Grand Vietnam (Vietnamese: Hoa hậu Hòa bình Việt Nam) is a national female beauty pageant in Vietnam, held annually since 2022, aiming to select the country representative for Miss Grand International, which is an annual international beauty pageant promoting World Peace and against all kinds of conflicts. The pageant has been organized by Sen Vàng Entertainment JSC, headed by the first Miss Grand Vietnam – Đoàn Thiên Ân, since its establishment

Since its first participation at Miss Grand International in 2013, Vietnam holds a record of 8 placements; in 2016 – 2023. The highest achievement is the winner of Miss Grand International, obtained by Nguyễn Thúc Thùy Tiên of Hồ Chí Minh City in 2021. Vietnam is the first Asian country to host Miss Grand International, as well as hosting the most after the host country–Thailand, with a total of three, in the years 2017, 2023 and 2027.

The reigning Miss Grand Vietnam is Emoura Phạm of Hồ Chí Minh City who was crowned on 31 July 2026 at the LaChateau Hotel, Phú Định ward, Hồ Chí Minh City. She will represent the country at the Miss Grand International 2026 pageant in India.

== Pageant ==
Since the establishment of Miss Grand International in 2013, Vietnam has always sent its representatives to compete at such every year. However, its first three candidates from 2013 to 2021 were either handpicked by the local contest organizers. Miss Grand Vietnam was founded in 2021 by Phạm Kim Dung, a business women and producer who produced Miss World Vietnam. The pageant has been streamed via its YouTube channel, Tiktok Live and Facebook. Each year the competition will replace the crown.

=== Location and date ===
Year	Editions	Date	Final venue	Province	Entrants	Ref.
2022	1st	October 1st	Phú Thọ Indoor Stadium, District 11	Hồ Chí Minh City	55	
2023	2nd	August 27th	Phú Thọ Indoor Stadium, District 11	Hồ Chí Minh City	48	
2024	3rd	August 3rd	NovaWorld, Phan Thiết	Bình Thuận	40	
2025	4th	September 14th	LaChateau Hotel, Phú Định ward	Hồ Chí Minh City	35	
2026	5th	July 31st	LaChateau Hotel, Phú Định ward	Hồ Chí Minh City	31	

=== Competition result ===
Year	Miss Grand Vietnam	1st Runner-Up	2nd Runner-Up	3rd Runner-Up	4th Runner-Up	Ref.
2022	Đoàn Thiên Ân; Long An	Chế Nguyễn Quỳnh Châu; Lâm Đồng	Trần Tuyết Như; Hồ Chí Minh City	Trần Nguyên Minh Thư; Quảng Trị	Ngô Thị Quỳnh Mai; Hồ Chí Minh City	
2023	Lê Hoàng Phương; Khánh Hòa	Bùi Khánh Linh; Bắc Giang	Trương Quí Minh Nhàn; Thừa Thiên Huế	Lê Thị Hồng Hạnh; Thái Bình	Đặng Hoàng Tâm Như; Thừa Thiên Huế	
2024	Võ Lê Quế Anh; Quảng Nam	Lê Phan Hạnh Nguyên; Đồng Tháp	Vũ Thị Thu Hiền; Hà Nội	Lâm Thị Bích Tuyền; An Giang	Phạm Thị Ánh Vương; Bình Thuận	
2025	Nguyễn Thị Yến Nhi; Đắk Lắk	Nguyễn Thị Thu Ngân; Cà Mau	Lê Thị Thu Trà; Nghệ An	Đinh Y Quyên; Gia Lai	La Ngọc Phương Anh; An Giang	
2026	Emoura Phạm; Hồ Chí Minh City	Ngô Bảo Ngọc; Hồ Chí Minh City	Võ Đoàn Bảo Hà; Đồng Nai	Phan Lê Kim Ngọc; Cần Thơ	Trịnh Yến Nhi; Đắk Lắk	

=== Regional rankings ===
Province/City	Titles	Winning years
Hồ Chí Minh City	1	2026
Đắk Lắk	1	2025
Đà Nẵng	1	2024 (Note: Quảng Nam province now has become a part of Da Nang)
Khánh Hòa	1	2023
Tây Ninh	1	2022 (Note: Long An province now has become a part of Tây Ninh province)

== International competitions ==
=== Miss Grand International ===
Year	Image	Miss Grand Vietnam	Hometown	National title	Year	Height	International title	Prize	Ref.
2013		Nguyễn Thị Bích Khanh	Tây Ninh	Appointed: Miss Star 2012	21	1.72 m (5 ft 7 1/2 in)	Unplaced		
2014		Cao Thùy Linh	Hồ Chí Minh City	Appointed	25	1.74 m (5 ft 8 1/2 in)	Unplaced	1 Special Awards: Best National Costume	
2015		Nguyễn Thị Lệ Quyên	Bạc Liêu	Appointed: 2nd runner-up Miss Ao Dai Vietnam 2014	22	1.75 m (5 ft 9 in)	Unplaced		
2016		Nguyễn Thị Loan	Thái Bình	Appointed: 2nd runner-up Miss Ethnic Vietnam 2013 Top 5 Miss Universe Vietnam 2015	26	1.70 m (5 ft 7 in)	Top 20		
2016		Trần Ngọc Lan Khuê	Hồ Chí Minh City	Appointed: Miss Aodai Vietnam 2014	24	Resigned			
2016		Huỳnh Thị Yến Nhi	Hồ Chí Minh City	Appointed: 1st Runner-up Miss World Vietnam 2016	24	Resigned			
2017		Nguyễn Trần Huyền My	Hà Nội	Appointed: 1st runner-up Miss Vietnam 2014	22	1.74 m (5 ft 8 1/2 in)	Top 10	1 Special Award: Miss Healthy & Beauty by Dr. Thanh (Sponsor)	
2018		Bùi Phương Nga	Hà Nội	Appointed: 1st runner-up Miss Vietnam 2018	20	1.73 m (5 ft 8 in)	Top 10	1 Special Award: Miss Popular Vote	
2019		Nguyễn Hà Kiều Loan	Quảng Nam	Appointed: 1st runner-up Miss World Vietnam 2019	19	1.70 m (5 ft 7 in)	Top 10	1 Special Award: Miss Popular Vote	
2020		Nguyễn Lê Ngọc Thảo	Hồ Chí Minh City	Appointed: 2nd runner-up Miss Vietnam 2020	20	1.74 m (5 ft 8 1/2 in)	Top 20		
2021		Nguyễn Thúc Thùy Tiên	Hồ Chí Minh City	Appointed: 1st runner-up Miss Southern Vietnam 2017 Top 5 Miss Vietnam 2018	23	1.70 m (5 ft 7 in)	Winner		
2022		Đoàn Thiên Ân	Long An	Miss Grand Vietnam 2022	22	1.75 m (5 ft 9 in)	Top 20	2 Special Awards: Country’s Power of the Year; Best National Costume	
2023		Lê Hoàng Phương	Khánh Hòa	Miss Grand Vietnam 2023	28	1.77 m (5 ft 9 1/2 in)	4th Runner-Up	1 Special Award: Best National Costume	
2024		Võ Lê Quế Anh	Quảng Nam	Miss Grand Vietnam 2024	23	1.73 m (5 ft 8 in)	Unplaced		
2025		Nguyễn Thị Yến Nhi	Đắk Lắk	Miss Grand Vietnam 2025	20	1.72 m (5 ft 7 1/2 in)	Unplaced		
2026		Emoura Phạm	Hồ Chí Minh City	Miss Grand Vietnam 2026	26		4th Runner-Up		

== See also ==
- Miss Grand International
- List of Vietnam representatives at international women beauty pageants
