= Ari Quế Anh =

Vietnamese beauty pageant titleholder

Võ Lê Quế Anh
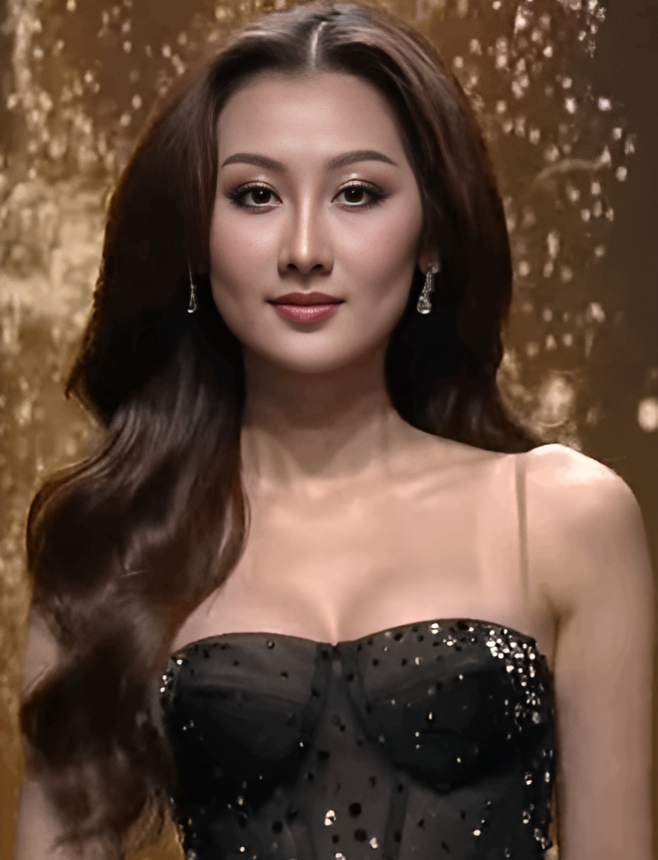
- Võ Lê Quế Anh in 2024
- Born: Quảng Nam, Vietnam
- Education: Huế University
- Height: 1.72 m (5 ft 8 in)
- Beauty pageant titleholder
- Title: Miss Grand Vietnam 2024
- Hair color: Black
- Eye color: Black
- Major competitions: Miss Huế University 2020; (1st Runner Up); Miss Vietnam 2020 (Unplaced); Miss Tourism Đà Nẵng 2022; (1st Runner Up); Miss Grand Vietnam 2024; (Winner); Miss Grand International 2024; (Unplaced); Miss Universe All-Stars 2026; (Winner)

Võ Lê Quế Anh is a Vietnamese beauty pageant titleholder who won Miss Grand Vietnam 2024 and represented Vietnam at Miss Grand International 2024.

== Pageantry ==
=== Miss Tourism Đà Nẵng 2022 ===
Võ Lê Quế Anh competed in Miss Tourism Da Nang 2022 and was first runner-up.

=== Miss Grand Vietnam 2024 ===
On 4 August 2024, she won Miss Grand Vietnam 2024 which took place in Phan Thiết, Bình Thuận. She represented Vietnam at Miss Grand International 2024.

=== Miss Grand International 2024 ===
Võ Lê Quế Anh represented Vietnam at Miss Grand International 2024 pageant, held at the MGI Hall in Bangkok, Thailand, on 25 October 2024. She was unplaced, ending Vietnam's 8-year streak of consecutive placements, from 2016 to 2023.

Awards and achievements
| Preceded by Lê Hoàng Phương | Miss Grand Vietnam; 2024 | Succeeded by Nguyễn Thị Yến Nhi |
