= Nguyễn Thị Yến Nhi =

Vietnamese beauty pageant winner (born 2004)

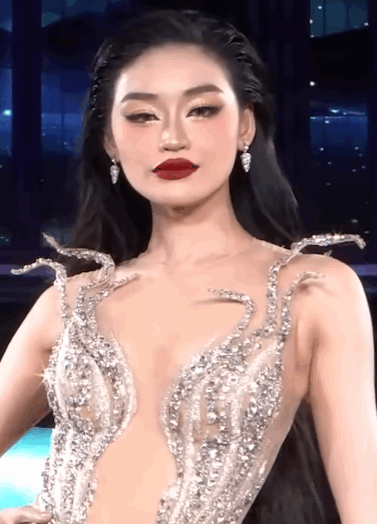
- Thị Yến Nhi in 2025
- Born: Nguyễn Thị Yến Nhi; 24 November 2004 (age 21); Đắk Lắk, Vietnam
- Beauty pageant titleholder
- Title: Miss Grand Vietnam 2025
- Major competitions: Miss Grand Vietnam 2024 (Top 15); Miss Grand Vietnam 2025 (Winner); Miss Grand International 2025 (Unplaced)

Nguyễn Thị Yến Nhi is a Vietnamese beauty pageant titleholder, who won Miss Grand Vietnam 2025 and represented Vietnam at Miss Grand International 2025.

== Pageantry ==
Thị Yến Nhi was first runner-up in MITC Phú Yên Model 2022. Thị Yến Nhi's first pageant was Miss Grand Vietnam 2024, where she reached the top 15, and won the Grand Voice award. On September 14, 2025, she won Miss Grand Vietnam 2025. Representing Vietnam, she was unplaced at Miss Grand International 2025 in Thailand and was unplaced.

Awards and achievements
Preceded by Võ Lê Quế Anh	Miss Grand Vietnam; 2025	Succeeded by Emoura Phạm
