= Miss Grand Germany =

Beauty pageant in Germany

- Formation: 12 September 2025; 12 months ago
- Founder: Kim Kelly Braun
- Headquarters: Mannheim
- Location: Germany
- Official language: German
- National director: Kim Kelly Braun
- Parent organization: Beauty Whisperer Academy (2025)
- Affiliations: Miss Grand International

Miss Grand Germany is a national female beauty pageant established in 2025 to select Germany's representative for the international competition Miss Grand International. It was founded by Kim Kelly Braun, a Thai-German entrepreneur, former Miss Grand Germany 2022, and chairperson of the Beauty Whisperer Academy.

Although the Miss Grand Germany pageant was officially established in 2025, the title had previously been conferred since 2013. Between 2013 and 2019, representatives were appointed directly by various franchise holders without a national competition being held. From 2020 to 2024, Germany's representatives were selected through the Miss From Germany pageant, headquartered in Duderstadt and organized by Leandro Aponte.

Since 2025, the national franchise has been held by Kim Kelly Braun, under whose direction the Miss Grand Germany pageant has been organized annually. Germany has yet to win the Miss Grand International title. The country's highest placement remains a Top 20 finish, achieved by Luisa Victoria Malz in 2021.

== History ==
Germany first participated in Miss Grand International in 2013. Between 2013 and 2018, all German representatives were appointed rather than selected through a dedicated national competition, with each appointee drawn from among the finalists of Miss Germany. In 2019, the franchise was acquired by the Duderstadt-based agency Leandro Aponte Model Scouting, headed by Venezuelan singer and model trainer Leandro Aponte. The organization subsequently launched a new national pageant, Miss From Germany, to select Germany's representatives for Miss Grand International beginning in 2020.

Because of the limited preparation time following the franchise acquisition, Germany's representative for the 2019 international competition was appointed instead of being selected through the newly established pageant. The first edition of Miss From Germany was subsequently held in 2020. Unlike Miss Grand International, Miss From Germany allowed married women to compete. Consequently, when the pageant winner did not meet the eligibility requirements of Miss Grand International, the runner-up was designated as Germany's representative. This difference in eligibility criteria also prompted the organizer to retain the title Miss From Germany instead of Miss Grand Germany.

In 2024, the franchise agreement between Miss From Germany and Miss Grand International PCL ended. It was subsequently transferred to Kim Kelly Braun, Miss Grand Germany 2022 and chairperson of the Beauty Whisperer Academy. Under her direction, the inaugural Miss Grand Germany pageant was held in Limburgerhof in September 2025.

== Editions ==
=== Location and date ===
Edition	Date	Venue	Entrants	Winner	Ref.
1st	12 September 2025	Golfrestaurant La Maison, Limburgerhof	10	Sadina Dudić	

== International competition ==
The following is a list of German representatives at the Miss Grand International contest.

Color keys

- : Declared as the winner
- : Ended as a runner-up (Top 5)
- : Ended as a finalist (Top 10)
- : Ended as a semifinalist (Top 20/21)
- : Ended as special awards winner

Year	State	Miss Grand Germany	National qualification	Placement	Special Awards	National Director
Did not compete in 2026
2025	Baden-Württemberg	Sadina Dudić	Miss Grand Germany 2025	Unplaced		Kim Kelly Braun
2024	North Rhine-Westphalia	Phi-Nhung Ilynn Sasolith	Appointment	Unplaced		Leandro Aponte
2023	North Rhine-Westphalia	Marie Tavitha Kilonzo	Miss From Germany 2023	Unplaced		Leandro Aponte
2022	Baden-Württemberg	Kim Kelly Braun	Miss From Germany 2022	Unplaced		Leandro Aponte
2021	Berlin	Luisa Victoria Malz	Miss From Germany 2021	Top 20		Leandro Aponte
2020	Bavaria	Arlinda Prenaj	Miss From Germany 2020	Unplaced		Leandro Aponte
2019	Baden-Württemberg	Lalaine Desiree Mahler	Finalist Miss Philippines Earth 2019	Unplaced		Leandro Aponte
2018	Bavaria	Mona Schafnitzl	Finalist Miss Universe Germany 2017	Unplaced		Horst Klemmer
2017	Berlin	Juliane Rohlmann	Finalist Miss Germany 2015	Unplaced		Horst Klemmer
Did not compete between 2015-2016
2014	North Rhine-Westphalia	Johanna Acs	Miss International Germany 2010	Unplaced		Horst Klemmer
2013	Thuringia	Diana König	Top 5 Miss Germany 2013	Unplaced		Horst Klemmer

== Gallery ==
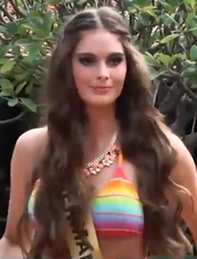
Miss Grand Germany 2014
Johanna Acs

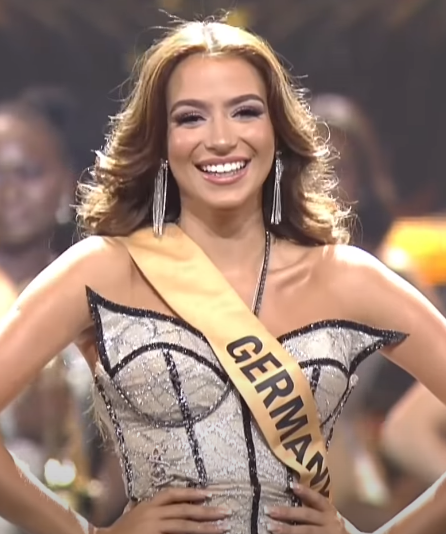
Miss Grand Germany 2021
Luisa Victoria Malz

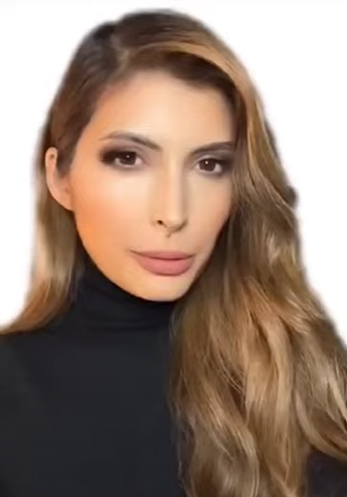
Miss Grand Germany 2022
Kim Kelly Braun

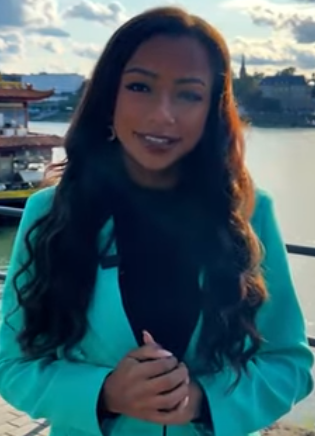
Miss Grand Germany 2023
Marie Kilonzo

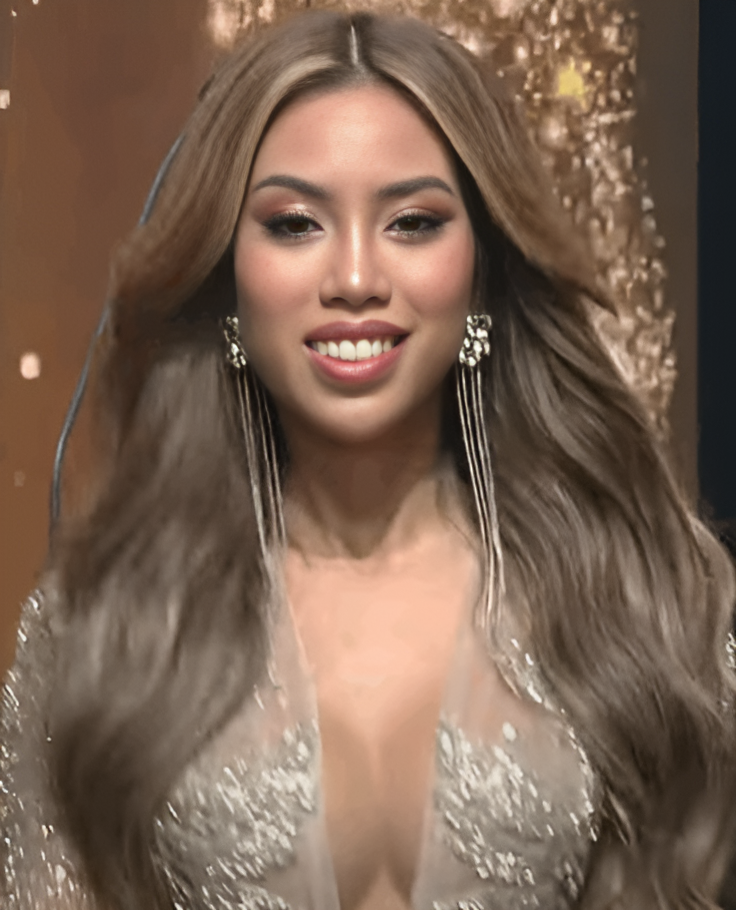
Miss Grand Germany 2024
Phi-Nhung Ilynn Sasolith

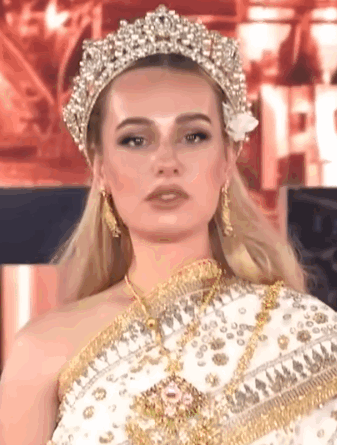
Miss Grand Germany 2025
Sadina Dudić
