= Miss Grand Vietnam 2022 =

Beauty pageant

- Date: October 1, 2022
- Presenters: Lương Thùy Linh; Thiên Vũ
- Venue: Phú Thọ Indoor Stadium, District 11, Ho Chi Minh City, Vietnam
- Broadcaster: YouTube; Facebook Live
- Entrants: 55
- Placements: 20
- Winner: Đoàn Thiên Ân, Long An
- Best National Costume: Trúc Chỉ – Trần Thanh Tâm (performed by Phạm Ngọc Phương Anh – Miss International Vietnam 2022)

Miss Grand Vietnam 2022 (Vietnamese: Hoa hậu Hòa bình Việt Nam 2022) was the inaugural Miss Grand Vietnam pageant, held at the Phú Thọ Indoor Stadium in Ho Chi Minh City, Vietnam, on October 1, 2022.

Đoàn Thiên Ân of Long An won the contest. She then represented Vietnam at Miss Grand International 2022, and reached the top 20.

== Background ==
=== History ===
After Nguyễn Thúc Thùy Tiên, won Miss Grand International 2021, the Miss Grand Vietnam licensee company, Sen Vang Entertainment, planned to organize the first contest of Miss Grand Vietnam in July 2022, but due to the short preparation time, it was postponed twice, firstly to September, then to October. The press conference of the contest was on 8 June 2022 at the Sofitel Saigon Plaza Hotel, and was attended by the president of Miss Grand International, Nawat Itsaragrisil and the top 10 finalists of Miss Grand Thailand 2022. The schedule of the contest was released on 18 August, and listed, a swimsuit contest, a fashion show, a national cultural costume contest, a preliminary round, and the final coronation night. All events were to run from 30 August to 1 October. The costumes selected by the judges in the national traditional contume contest became Vietnam's representative attire for Miss Grand International 2022, which was held in Indonesia.

With the Thanh Hóa Provincial People's Committee, Sen Vang Entertainment planned the inaugural edition for 6 August 2021 in Thanh Hóa, as the sub-event of the Thanh Hóa Cultural and Tourism Week 2022. The contestants' registration would be late April, a pageant boot camp in May, and the preliminary contest in June. The press conference was held on 19 March 2021. However, the event was later cancelled, and the Miss Grand Vietnam 2021 titleholder was appointed instead.

=== Contest locations and dates ===
Date	Event	Venue	Ref.
30 August	Preliminary round	South Saigon Marine Club, District 7, Ho Chi Minh City	
5 September	Preliminary round	Sen Vang Company, Bình Thạnh district, Ho Chi Minh City	
14 September	Swimsuit competition	Long Islands Castle, Thủ Đức, Ho Chi Minh City	
23 September	National costume competition	Phú Thọ Indoor Stadium, District 10, Ho Chi Minh City	
28 September	Pre-final competition	Phú Thọ Indoor Stadium, District 10, Ho Chi Minh City	
1 October	Grand final coronation	Phú Thọ Indoor Stadium, District 10, Ho Chi Minh City	

In addition, a contest for designers for the creative national costumes section was also held virtually from 6 August to 15 September.

=== Selection of contestants ===
The registration for the contest was officially started on 5 May and ended on 30 August, only a direct application through the central organizer was accepted, and no regional pageants were held to determine the candidates. During registration, an additional online selection chose applicants to participate in the first round of an online qualification contest. 78 candidates qualified for the offline preliminary contest on 30 August to select the final delegates for the national round, including:

- Chế Nguyễn Quỳnh Châu, one of the top 15 of Miss Universe Vietnam 2015 and top five of Miss Ao Dai 2016.
- Ngô Thị Quỳnh Mai also known as Mai Ngô, one of the top 45 of Miss Universe Vietnam 2015, a runner-up of the Face Vietnam season 1, a contestant of Asia's Next Top Model cycle 4, and one of the top 70 of Miss Universe Vietnam 2017, but withdrew for personal reasons.
- Trần Tuyết Như, an entrepreneur, model, and model training coach, who was the first runner-up in Miss China-Asean Etiquette 2017, one of the top 11 on The Face Vietnam season 3, and one of the top 16 of Miss Universe Vietnam 2022.
- Vũ Như Quỳnh, a freelance model, who won Miss Ao Dai 2019, was one of the top five of the Miss Hanoi, and also reached the top 37 at Miss World Vietnam 2022.

== Results ==
=== Placements ===
Color keys

- Ended as finalist or semifinalist in an International pageant.

Placement	Contestant	International placement
Miss Grand Vietnam 2022	Long An – Đoàn Thiên Ân	Top 20 – Miss Grand International 2022
1st runner-up	Lâm Đồng – Chế Nguyễn Quỳnh Châu	
2nd runner-up	Ho Chi Minh City – Trần Tuyết Như	
3rd runner-up	Quảng Trị – Trần Nguyên Minh Thư	
4th runner-up	Ho Chi Minh City – Ngô Thị Quỳnh Mai	
Top 10	An Giang – Bùi Lý Thiên Hương; Cao Bằng – Lê Minh Phượng §; Hanoi – Chu Lê Vi Anh; Hanoi – Đỗ Trần Tuệ Anh ∆; Ho Chi Minh City – Nguyễn Thị Hồng Tuyết	
Top 15	Đắk Lắk – Nguyễn Tiểu Hồng; Hanoi – Phạm Thuỳ Dương; Ho Chi Minh City – Đỗ Trịnh Quỳnh Như; Thái Bình – Lê Thị Hồng Hạnh; Quảng Nam – Võ Thị Thương; Quảng Ninh – Vũ Thị Thảo Ly	
Top 20	Cần Thơ – Đinh Thị Mỹ Ái; Đắk Lắk – Nguyễn Thị Diễm; Ho Chi Minh City – Lê Thị Kim Huyền; Long An – Nguyễn Anh Thư; Quảng Nam – Trần Thị Thuỳ Trâm	

§ – placed into the Top 10 by Miss Popular Vote
∆ – placed into the Top 10 by Miss Inspiration

== Contestants ==
50 delegates have been confirmed to participate.

Contestants	Age	Height	Province	Placement	Ref.
Bùi Bích Diệp	25	1.66 m (5 ft 5 1/2 in)	Hanoi		
Bùi Lý Thiên Hương	26	1.73 m (5 ft 8 in)	An Giang	Top 10	
Bùi Thị Thục Hiền	22	1.68 m (5 ft 6 in)	Ho Chi Minh City		
Cao Thị Cẩm Tú	24	1.77 m (5 ft 9 1/2 in)	Tiền Giang		
Chế Nguyễn Quỳnh Châu	28	1.75 m (5 ft 9 in)	Lâm Đồng	1st Runner-up	
Chu Lê Vi Anh	24	1.68 m (5 ft 6 in)	Hanoi	Top 10	
Dương Phạm Kỳ Duyên	20	1.67 m (5 ft 5 1/2 in)	Hanoi		
Đặng Thị Mỹ Khôi	25	1.66 m (5 ft 5 1/2 in)	Ho Chi Minh City		
Đặng Thị Tứ	22	1.72 m (5 ft 7 1/2 in)	Quảng Nam		
Đinh Thị Mỹ Ái	25	1.66 m (5 ft 5 1/2 in)	Cần Thơ	Top 20	
Đoàn Thiên Ân	22	1.75 m (5 ft 9 in)	Long An	Miss Grand Vietnam 2022	
Đỗ Trần Tuệ Anh	20	1.72 m (5 ft 7 1/2 in)	Hanoi	Top 10	
Đỗ Trịnh Quỳnh Như	25	1.75 m (5 ft 9 in)	Ho Chi Minh City	Top 15	
Hoàng Thị Kim Chi	25	1.68 m (5 ft 6 in)	Quảng Trị		
Hoàng Thị Mai Thảo	24	1.68 m (5 ft 6 in)	Bình Phước		
Huỳnh Thới Ngọc Thảo	28	1.65 m (5 ft 5 in)	Bình Dương		
Lê Minh Phượng	24	1.72 m (5 ft 7 1/2 in)	Cao Bằng	Top 10	
Lê Thị Hồng Hạnh	22	1.68 m (5 ft 6 in)	Thái Bình	Top 15	
Lê Thị Kim Huyền	23	1.77 m (5 ft 9 1/2 in)	Ho Chi Minh City	Top 20	
Mai Thị Ngọc Tâm	28	1.69 m (5 ft 6 1/2 in)	Ho Chi Minh City		
Ngô Thị Quỳnh Mai	27	1.73 m (5 ft 8 in)	Ho Chi Minh City	4th Runner-up	
Nguyễn Anh Thư	26	1.79 m (5 ft 10 1/2 in)	Long An	Top 20	
Nguyễn Hải Âu	25	1.65 m (5 ft 5 in)	Nghệ An		
Nguyễn Khánh Linh	22	1.68 m (5 ft 6 in)	Hanoi		
Nguyễn Tâm Như	22	1.67 m (5 ft 5 1/2 in)	An Giang		
Nguyễn Thanh Trâm	20	1.72 m (5 ft 7 1/2 in)	Ho Chi Minh City		
Nguyễn Thị Diễm	26	1.70 m (5 ft 7 in)	Đắk Lắk	Top 20	
Nguyễn Thị Diễm Trân	24	1.70 m (5 ft 7 in)	Bến Tre		
Nguyễn Thị Hồng Tuyết	26	1.67 m (5 ft 5 1/2 in)	Ho Chi Minh City	Top 10	
Nguyễn Thị Kiều My	23	1.66 m (5 ft 5 1/2 in)	Tây Ninh		
Nguyễn Thị Minh Trang	25	1.73 m (5 ft 8 in)	Hanoi		
Nguyễn Thị Mỹ Duyên	20	1.76 m (5 ft 9 1/2 in)	An Giang		
Nguyễn Thị Quỳnh Trang	22	1.68 m (5 ft 6 in)	Nghệ An		
Nguyễn Thị Thùy Vi	22	1.72 m (5 ft 7 1/2 in)	Trà Vinh		
Nguyễn Thị Trúc Quỳnh	24	1.71 m (5 ft 7 1/2 in)	Bà Rịa–Vũng Tàu		
Nguyễn Thị Vân Anh	22	1.75 m (5 ft 9 in)	Bình Dương		
Nguyễn Tiểu Hồng	19	1.72 m (5 ft 7 1/2 in)	Đắk Lắk	Top 15	
Phạm Thị Phương Trinh	19	1.72 m (5 ft 7 1/2 in)	Quảng Nam		
Phạm Thùy Dương	19	1.70 m (5 ft 7 in)	Hanoi	Top 15	
Phù Thị Phương Trang	20	1.67 m (5 ft 5 1/2 in)	Ho Chi Minh City		
Trần Nguyên Minh Thư	21	1.70 m (5 ft 7 in)	Quảng Trị	3rd Runner-up	
Trần Thị Khánh Linh	19	1.67 m (5 ft 5 1/2 in)	Hà Tĩnh		
Trần Thị Thanh Nhật	20	1.71 m (5 ft 7 1/2 in)	Thái Bình		
Trần Thị Thùy Trâm	26	1.68 m (5 ft 6 in)	Quảng Nam	Top 20	
Trần Tuyết Như	27	1.70 m (5 ft 7 in)	Thái Bình	2nd Runner-up	
Trần Vũ Hương Trà	24	1.68 m (5 ft 6 in)	Hanoi		
Võ Thị Thương	21	1.67 m (5 ft 5 1/2 in)	Quảng Nam	Top 15	
Vũ Như Quỳnh	23	1.68 m (5 ft 6 in)	Gia Lai		
Vũ Thị Hà	27	1.65 m (5 ft 5 in)	Thanh Hóa		
Vũ Thị Thảo Ly	23	1.67 m (5 ft 5 1/2 in)	Quảng Ninh	Top 15	

== Judges ==
- Miss Vietnam 1992 Hà Kiều Anh - Jury president
- Sen Vàng Productions director/ Mr. Hoang Nhat Nam - Jury vice-president
- Mr. Nguyễn Minh Tiệp - Actor
- Miss Nguyễn Thúc Thùy Tiên - Miss Grand International 2021 from Vietnam
- Supermodel Nguyễn Thị Anh Thư - Actress
- Supermodel Nguyễn Minh Tú - Miss Supranational Asia 2018
- Fashion designer Do Long
- Model Nguyễn Lê Ngọc Thảo - Miss Vietnam 2020 2nd Runner Up
- Mr. Vũ Văn Tiến - Journalist
- Mr. Ngô Bá Lục - Journalist
- Mr. Nicholas Pham - TikTok Vietnam Head of Operations
