= Lê Hoàng Phương =

Vietnamese beauty pageant titleholder

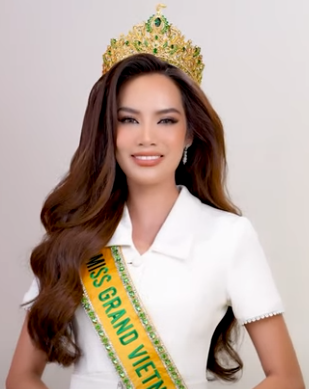
- Born: Lê Hoàng Phương; 1995 or 1996 (age 30–31); Cam Ranh, Khánh Hòa, Vietnam
- Education: Ngô Gia Tự High School; Ho Chi Minh City University of Technology
- Beauty pageant titleholder
- Title: Miss Grand Vietnam 2023
- Major competitions: Miss Universe Vietnam 2019 (Top 10); Miss Universe Vietnam 2022 (Top 5); Miss Grand Vietnam 2023 (Winner); Miss Grand International 2023 (4th Runner-up)

Lê Hoàng Phương is a Vietnamese beauty pageant titleholder who won Miss Grand Vietnam 2023. She represented Vietnam at Miss Grand International 2023 in Vietnam and was fourth runner-up. She reached the top 10 at Miss Universe Vietnam 2019 and top five at Miss Universe Vietnam 2022.

== Early life and education ==
Lê Hoàng Phương was born in 1995 or 1996 (age 30–31). She studied at Ngo Gia Tu High School. She also graduated with Honors from Ho Chi Minh City University of Technology. Currently, she is an architect and CEO of an architecture company, specializing in drawing, designing and constructing works.

== Pageantry ==
=== Miss Universe Vietnam 2019 and 2022 ===
In 2019, Phương competed in Miss Universe Vietnam 2019 and reached the top 10. She received the special awards of Beach Beauty and Best Face.

On June 25, 2022, Phương reached the top five of Miss Universe Vietnam 2022, and received the special award of Best Catwalk.

=== Miss Supranational Vietnam 2023 ===
Phương entered Miss Supranational Vietnam 2022 but later withdrew.

=== Miss Grand Vietnam 2023 ===
Phương entered and won Miss Grand Vietnam 2023, against 43 contestants, on August 27, 2023, at Phú Thọ Indoor Stadium, Ho Chi Minh City. She was crowned by Doan Thien An, Miss Grand Vietnam 2022.

=== Miss Grand International 2023 ===
Phương represented Vietnam at Miss Grand International 2023 in Vietnam, where she was fourth runner-up.

Awards and achievements
Preceded by Mariana Bečková	Miss Grand International 4th Runner-up; 2023	Succeeded by Talita Hartmann (Elevated); María Felix (Assumed)
Preceded by Đoàn Thiên Ân	Miss Grand Vietnam; 2023	Succeeded by Võ Lê Quế Anh
