= Hà Kiều Anh =

Vietnamese beauty pageant contestant (born 1976)

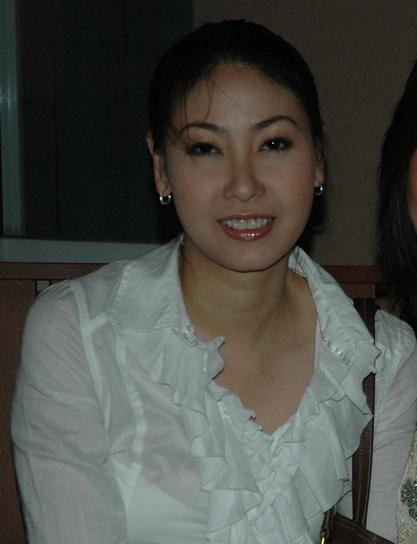
- Born: May 17, 1976 (age 50); Hanoi, North Vietnam
- Education: Conservatory of Ho Chi Minh City
- Occupations: Actress; Former Beauty Queen
- Height: 1.74 m (5 ft 9 in)
- Spouse(s): Nguyễn Gia Thiều (m. 2002; div. 2007) Huỳnh Trung Nam (m. 2007)
- Children: 3
- Beauty pageant titleholder
- Title: Miss Vietnam 1992
- Years active: 1992–present
- Hair color: Black
- Eye color: Black
- Major competitions: Miss Vietnam 1992 (Winner); World Miss University 1993 (Top 5)

Hà Kiều Anh (born 17 May 1976) is a Vietnamese actress and former beauty queen.

She was born in Hanoi, but her family came from the Thua Thien Hue province in central Vietnam. When she was 5 years old, her family relocated to Ho Chi Minh City. She was crowned Miss Vietnam in 1992.

Anh starred in Lục Vân Tiên, a 2002 Vietnamese TV film on Lục Vân Tiên, a 19th-century epic poem, as the heroine Kiều Nguyệt Nga. Though filming of a scene where she is shown bathing in a stream created a small scandal in Vietnam when “nude photos” were leaked due to the negligence of the film crew.

On June 7, 2022, it was announced that Anh would assume the role of jury president of the Miss Grand Vietnam 2022 pageant.
