= Nguyễn Thúc Thùy Tiên =

Vietnamese model and beauty pageant titleholder

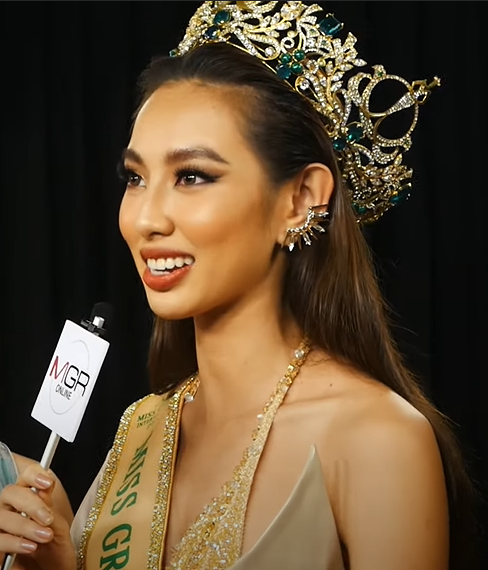
- Nguyễn Thúc Thùy Tiên in 2024
- Born: Nguyễn Thúc Thùy Tiên; 12 August 1998 (age 28); Ho Chi Minh City, Vietnam
- Education: Ho Chi Minh City University of Social Sciences and Humanities; Hoa Sen University
- Occupations: Model; Beauty pageant titleholder
- Height: 1.70 m (5 ft 7 in)
- Beauty pageant titleholder
- Title: Miss International Vietnam 2018; Miss Grand Vietnam 2021; Miss Grand International 2021
- Hair color: Black
- Eye color: Black
- Major competitions: Miss Southern Region Vietnam 2017 (1st Runner-up); Miss Vietnam 2018 (Top 5); Miss International 2018 (Unplaced); Miss Grand International 2021 (Winner)

Nguyễn Thúc Thùy Tiên (born August 12, 1998) is a Vietnamese beauty queen and model. Crowned Miss Grand International 2021 on 4 December 2021 at Bangkok, Thailand, she is the first Vietnamese woman to win the title. Before that, she also represented Vietnam at Miss International 2018 in Japan. She was awarded the Certificate of Merit by the Prime Minister of Vietnam Phạm Minh Chính for Prominent Young Face 2021 (Vietnamese: Gương mặt trẻ tiêu biểu 2021).

== Early life and education ==
Tiên was born on August 12, 1998, in Ho Chi Minh City. She once read French Language at the Faculty of French Language of University of Social Sciences and Humanities, a member of Vietnam National University, Ho Chi Minh City system before switching to a new major and then obtaining her bachelor's degree in International Hotel and Restaurant Management (joint program with Vatel) from the Hoa Sen University in 2022.

== Pageantry ==
=== Miss International 2018 ===
Tiên was appointed to be the replacement representative at Miss International 2018 held in Japan. She did not enter the Top 15.

=== Miss Grand Vietnam 2021 ===
Tiên was appointed as Miss Grand Vietnam 2021 and later participated at Miss Grand International 2021. She was crowned on November 16, 2021.

=== Miss Grand International 2021 ===
During the national costume competition, held on November 30, she wore a costume entitled “Blue Angel” by designer Tín Thái, that featured a pair of huge wings with gilded decorations behind, an elaborated headdress, gloves, as well as bulky platform boots with 8-inch heels that reportedly hindered her walk. Her costume made strong impression and was positively commented, in spite of another mishap that took place towards the end of her performance when her right wing unexpectedly collapsed, leading Thùy Tiên to comment on the incident on her Facebook page: "Thank you so much! There was a little incident with the wings, but I hope everyone will ignore it and support me in the upcoming rounds."

At the preliminary competition, held on December 2, she wore a red dress during the evening gown performance.

On December 4, at the final show, Thùy Tiên was advanced to Top 20. After that, she then wore a blue two-piece bikini at the swimsuit competition that helped her advance to Top 10.

During the English presentation of Miss Grand International 2021, she answered on the topic of world peace. Right after that, she said a sentence in Thai that means "Make the world a better place for everyone", while raising 3 fingers together, a protest symbol greeting, anti-dictatorship inspired by the Hunger Games, is also the salute of pro- democracy protesters in Thailand and Myanmar.

During the Top 10 evening gown performance, she wore a dress called "The Crown Dress". This is also the dress chosen by the beauty in the Miss Grand Vietnam 2021 crowning ceremony.

With that answer and her evening gown performance, once again she advanced to Top 5.

With the best interview questions in English and Thai, she won the title and was crowned by Miss Grand International 2020, Abena Appiah. She received the iconic Golden Crown and a $60,000 cash prize.

In her capacity as Miss Grand International 2021, she travelled to Thailand, Peru, Ecuador, Colombia, Spain, Angola, Romania, United Kingdom, Malaysia, India, Indonesia, and her home country of Vietnam.

=== Vietnam International Fashion Week 2022 ===
On May 29, 2022, Tiên made a guest star appearance in Hoàng Hải's fashion show Bướm hoang/Wild Butterfly (the closing show of the Aquafina Vietnam International Fashion Week Spring/Summer 2022), for which she was the showstopper, dressed in a rhinestone, thigh-high split dress with angel wings. Her left shoelace came loose and gradually slipped down during her walk, which caused her to trip on the 3D butterfly decorations attached to it and fall on the catwalk. The incident received widespread attention throughout the Vietnamese media, to the point that Tiên gave her own comments on what exactly happened.

== Scandals ==
=== Accused of owing money ===
After being announced as Vietnam's representative at Miss Grand International 2021, Thuy Tien was asked by Dang Thuy Trang - sister of model Dang Thu Thao to pay a debt of 1.5 billion VND. In May 2019, a debt collection clip between Dang Thuy Trang and Nguyen Thuc Thuy Tien was posted on social media. In this clip, Thuy Trang affirmed that Thuy Tien borrowed 1.5 billion VND from her but avoided paying. A debt note was made public by Thuy Trang with Thuy Tien's signature and fingerprint when borrowing money for the purpose of competing in Miss Southern Vietnam 2017. This agreement between the two parties was signed on July 22, 2017, with a deadline of one year for Thuy Tien to pay all the money to Thuy Trang. Also in the clip, Thuy Tien claimed that Thuy Trang had deceived her, not helped her. While Thuy Trang was not paying attention while talking, Thuy Tien snatched the agreement and tore it up.

=== False product advertising ===
On May 19, 2025, the Investigation Police Agency issued a decision to prosecute and temporarily detain Thuy Tien to investigate the crime of defrauding customers under Article 193 of the 2015 Penal Code. Through the investigation, the agency determined that Kera candy was a joint business product between her and the shareholders of the company Chi Em Rot, in which Thuy Tien received profits according to the capital contribution agreement equivalent to 30%, while the remaining shareholders contributed up to 70%. In addition, the agency also said that the company had sold more than 135,000 boxes of Kera candy with a total revenue of nearly 18 billion VND, Thuy Tien alone was paid a commission of nearly 7 billion VND. On the morning of May 20, the Office of the Investigation Police Agency of the Ministry of Public Security and the Supreme People's Procuracy searched Thuy Tien's residence. The Sen Vang Management Company then terminated the contract with Thuy Tien and the movie Chot Don!, in which she played the main role, was removed from the theater system. On May 23, the Central Committee of the Ho Chi Minh Communist Youth Union also stripped Thuy Tien of the title of Outstanding Young Vietnamese Face.

== Arrest ==
In May 2025, Tiên was arrested for consumer fraud after promoting a counterfeit fiber supplement on social media.

Awards and achievements
Preceded by (United States) Abena Appiah	Miss Grand International; 2021	Succeeded by (Brazil) Isabella Menin
Preceded by Nguyễn Lê Ngọc Thảo	Miss Grand Vietnam; 2021	Succeeded by Đoàn Thiên Ân
Preceded by Huỳnh Thị Thùy Dung	Miss International Vietnam; 2018	Succeeded by Nguyễn Tường San
Preceded by Dương Thị Mỹ Duyên	1st Runner Up Miss Southern Region Vietnam; 2017	Succeeded by Bùi Thùy Nhiên
