= Miss Grand International 2022 =

10th Miss Grand International Competition, beauty pageant edition

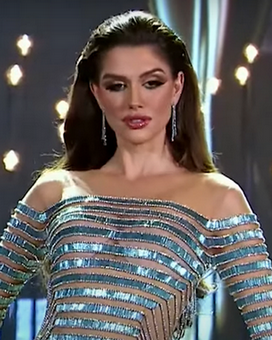
- Isabella Menin
- Date: 25 October 2022
- Presenters: Matthew Deane
- Entertainment: Rossa; Project Pop
- Venue: Sentul International Convention Center, Sentul City, Bogor, West Java, Indonesia
- Broadcaster: YouTube
- Entrants: 68
- Placements: 21
- Debuts: Mozambique
- Withdrawals: Armenia; Egypt; Liberia; Northern Ireland; Siberia; Sweden
- Returns: Belarus; China; Crimea; Denmark; Ghana; Ireland; Jamaica; Mongolia; Poland; Singapore; Turkey; Uganda; Ukraine; United Kingdom
- Winner: Isabella Menin; Brazil
- Best National Costume: Janet Leyva; (Peru); Engfa Waraha; (Thailand); Sofia Mayers; (United Kingdom); Thiên Ân Ðoàn; (Vietnam)
- Best in Evening Gown: Laysha Salazar (Mexico)

Miss Grand International 2022 was the 10th Miss Grand International pageant, held at the Sentul International Convention Center in Bogor, West Java, Indonesia, on 25 October 2022.

At the end of the event, Nguyễn Thúc Thùy Tiên of Vietnam crowned Isabella Menin of Brazil as Miss Grand International 2022. It is the first victory of Brazil in the pageant.

Contestants from sixty-eight countries and territories competed in this year's pageant. The pageant was hosted by Thai television personality Matthew Deane. Indonesian singer Rossa performed in this year's pageant.

== Background ==
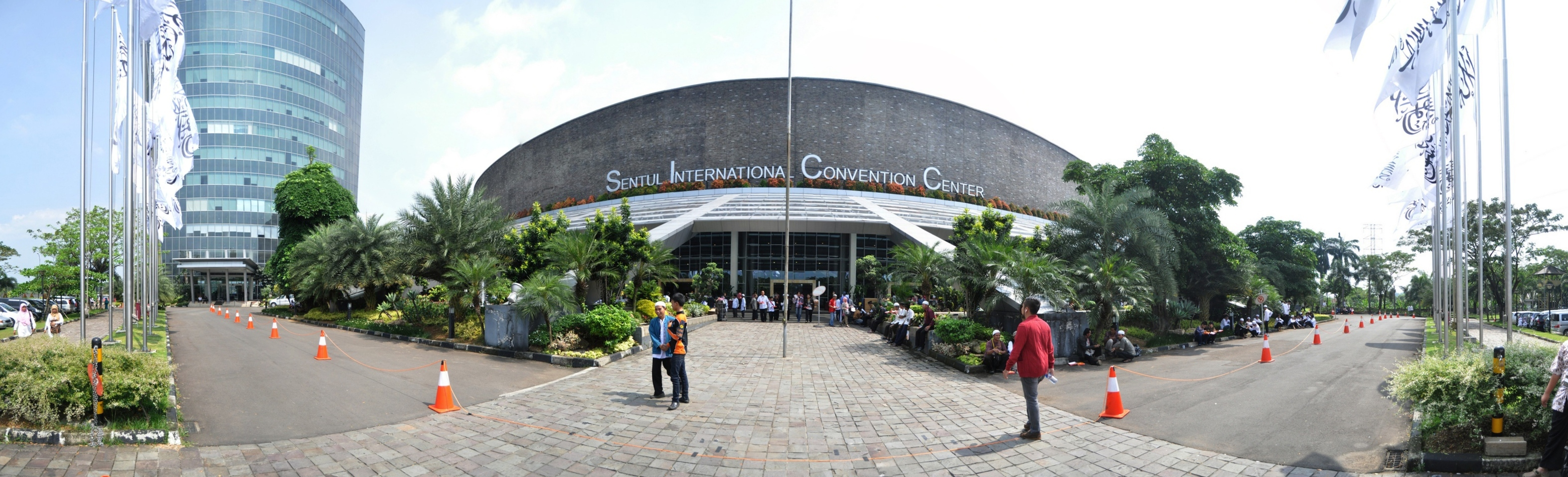
Sentul International Convention Center, the venue of the pageant

=== Location and date ===
At the Miss Grand International 2021 pageant, Matthew Deane, the host of the event announced that the 10th edition of the pageant would take place in Indonesia on 25 October 2022, with pre-pageant activities in Bali, and the coronation night in Jakarta. The event was supported by the Minister of Tourism and Creative Economy of Indonesia, Sandiaga Uno.

After a venue selection survey conducted by the Dunia Mega Bintang Foundation, licensee of Miss Grand Indonesia in mid-May, the organization announced that the coronation night of Miss Grand International 2022 pageant will take place at Sentul International Convention Center. Furthermore, the S.I.C.C. also served as the location for the national costume parade and the preliminary competition. The organization later disclosed that Le Méridien Jakarta and Seminyak Beach Resort & Spa will serve as accommodation for the delegates during the pageant activities in Jakarta and Bali, respectively. Gianyar's Bali Safari and Marine Park was also announced as the venue of the Balinese costume presentation.

=== Selection of participants ===
Contestants from sixty-eight countries and territories have been selected to compete in the competition. Thirty-seven of these delegates were appointed to the position after being a runner-up of their national pageant or being selected through a casting process.

==== Replacements ====
Chiara Vanderveeren, a contestant of the Miss Grand Belgium 2022 pageant, was appointed as the replacement for Miss Grand Belgium 2022 Alyssa Gilliaert, who resigned due to medical conditions. Camila Sanabria, Miss Supranational Bolivia 2023, was appointed as Miss Grand Bolivia 2022 due to Alondra Mercado's renouncement of the title. Fabien Laurencio, first runner-up at Nuestra Belleza Latina 2021, was appointed as Miss Grand Cuba 2022, as Daniela Espinosa renounced her title due to undisclosed reasons. Lisseth Naranjo, a former Miss Grand Ecuador who had resigned from the title in 2020, was designated as the replacement for Emilia Vásquez, Miss Grand Ecuador 2022, who withdrew due to undisclosed reasons. Laura de Sanctis, Miss Universe Panama 2017 was designated Miss Grand Panama 2022 by a new Miss Grand Panama license. Originally, Katheryn Yejas was named Miss Grand Panama 2022 but was later ostracized due to the change of license holder. Luiseth Materán, Miss Universe Venezuela 2021, was appointed to the position after the original representative, Sabrina Deraneck, resigned from the title within a month after being crowned.

An internal conflict in the license team between Orlando Ruiz, a founder of the Concurso Nacional de Belleza México (CNB México) who also served as the general director of Miss Grand México, and Flavio Falsiroli, Miss Grand México national director, caused Orlando Ruiz to depart from the team and his affiliated candidate, Jessica Farjat, who was previously set to represent the country at Miss Grand International 2022, also resigned from the title. Laysha Salazar was then elected as the replacement.

==== Debuts, returns, and withdrawals ====
In this 2022 edition, three countries were expected to make their debuts, but two withdrew for unspecified reasons even though their representatives had already been determined; six countries that competed in the 2021 edition withdrew due to a lack of a national licensee, and 15 countries returned to the competition after being absent in the previous editions. Initially, seventy-two countries and territories franchises confirmed that they would send their candidates to Indonesia; however, representatives from Cameroon, the Democratic Republic of the Congo, Kazakhstan, and Kyrgyzstan, withdrew before the pageant started, while the representative from Kosovo withdrew due to health problems at the fourth day of the pre-final activities.

=== Controversies ===
On 3 October, the pageant organizer revealed all the roommate pairing lists of Miss Grand International 2022 candidates in a live video streamed on the pageant's official Facebook page, in which the Russian and Ukrainian candidates were paired as roommates amid the ongoing war between the two countries. The issue has sparked an overwrought discussion on many social media sites because of the tense political situation between the two countries over the past few months, Some accused the organizer of attempting to profit from the conflict by pairing the two contestants on purpose to make the contest viral and demanded the organizer adjust the room sharing situation, while others advised thinking optimistically and that the beauty competition had nothing to do with the war.

However, even though the representative from Russia, Ekaterina Astashenkova, has stated through social media that there is no problem staying together with the Ukrainian representatives during the contest, the Ukrainian representative, Olga Vasyliv, denied doing so and also called for removing Russia from the competition.

== Results ==
=== Placements ===
Placement	Contestant
Miss Grand International 2022	Brazil – Isabella Menin
1st Runner-Up	Thailand – Engfa Waraha
2nd Runner-Up	Indonesia – Andina Julie
3rd Runner-Up	Venezuela – Luiseth Materán
4th Runner-Up	Czech Republic – Mariana Bečková
5th Runners-Up	Cambodia - Pichvotey Saravody (Dethroned); Colombia – Priscilla Londoño; Mauritius – Yuvna Gookool § (Resigned); Philippines – Roberta Tamondong (Assumed); Puerto Rico – Oxana Rivera; Spain – Hirisley Jiménez
Top 20	Curaçao – Kanisha Sluis; Denmark – Victoria Theilvig; Dominican Republic – Jearmanda Ramos; Honduras – Saira Cacho; Mexico – Laysha Salazar; Nigeria – Damilola Bolarinde; Paraguay – Agatha León; Peru – Janet Leyva; United Kingdom – Sofia Mayers; Vietnam – Thiên Ân Đoàn ‡

§ – Voted into the Top 10 by viewers and awarded as Miss Popular Vote
‡ – Voted into the Top 20 by viewers and awarded as Country's Power of the Year

=== Special awards ===
Award	Contestant
Best in Evening Gown	Mexico – Laysha Salazar
Best National Costumes	Peru – Janet Leyva; Thailand – Engfa Waraha; United Kingdom – Sofia Mayers; Vietnam – Thiên Ân Ðoàn
Country's Power of the Year	Vietnam – Thiên Ân Ðoàn
Grand Voice Award	Thailand – Engfa Waraha
Miss Popular Vote	Mauritius – Yuvna Gookool
Miss Social Media by MS Glow (sponsor)	Czech Republic – Mariana Bečková

== Pre-pageant events ==
=== Pre-arrival voting ===
As previously done since 2018, pre-arrival voting on the organizer's Facebook and Instagram pages was launched a week before the advent of the candidates. Ten contestants with the most scores calculated by the number of likes and shares on their portrait photos acquired the authority to be present at the exclusive dinner with the pageant president, Nawat Itsaragrisil, which happened after the welcome ceremony at the Seminyak Beach Resort & Spa on 5 October.

Placement	Contestant
Winners	Brazil – Isabella Menin; Colombia – Priscilla Londoño; Guatemala – Andrea Radford; India – Praachi Nagpal; Indonesia – Andina Julie; Malaysia – Charissa Chong; Mexico – Laysha Salazar; Paraguay – Agatha León; Thailand – Engfa Waraha; Vietnam – Thiên Ân Ðoàn

=== Country's Power of the Year challenge ===
The Country's Power of the Year award returned after being introduced for the first time in 2020, with fans able to vote for delegates to advance to the Top 20 through Instagram. All candidates were divided into ten groups for the challenge. The voting took place on the pageant's Instagram account, where the photos to vote for was presented for one group per day. The winner of each group advanced to the second round where all ten qualified contestants were randomly grouped into two groups of five. Then, the voting took place to elect the two winners of each group to advance into the final round. The winner of the Country's Power of the Year challenge will automatically be part of the Top 20.

Placement	Contestant
Winner	Vietnam – Thiên Ân Ðoàn
Runner-up	Thailand – Engfa Waraha
Top 4	Colombia – Priscilla Londoño; Indonesia – Andina Julie
Top 10	Costa Rica – Brenda Muñoz; Guatemala – Andrea Radford; India – Praachi Nagpal; Malaysia – Charissa Chong; Mexico – Laysha Salazar; Paraguay – Agatha León

=== Sportswear and swimsuit competition ===
Since Indonesia is a Muslim country, appearing in a swimsuit in public violates religious tenets requiring women to dress modestly. Because of this, the swimsuit event was held as a private event at the Seminyak Beach Resort & Spa, where no physical audience was allowed but was broadcast online except for the host country. Indonesian swimwear label called Niconico was used in this event. The swimsuit competition was replaced by the sportswear competition at the preliminary and final competitions. The sportswear competition took place on 9 October at the Bebek Tepi Sawah Restaurant and Villas in Ubud, Bali, in which 68 aspirants wore sportswear designed by Indonesian designers, Didiet Maulana and the Iwan Tirta Batik team.

For the Best in Swimsuit award, ten candidates were chosen by the public vote on the pageant's Facebook page, and the other ten were chosen by the panel of judges; the number of each group was then minimized to five. The winner was expected to be announced at the final competition, but was not elected.

Placement	Contestant
Top 10	Brazil – Isabella Menin; Cambodia – Pichvotey Saravody; Colombia – Priscilla Londoño; Czech Republic – Mariana Bečková; Indonesia – Andina Julie; Myanmar – Ei Ei Aung Htunt; Puerto Rico – Oxana Rivera; Spain – Hirisley Jiménez; Thailand – Engfa Waraha; Vietnam – Thiên Ân Doàn

== Pageant ==
=== Format ===
From twenty-one on the previous edition, twenty semi-finalists were selected to continue in the competition. The results of the preliminary competition — which consisted of the swimsuit competition, the evening gown competition, the closed-door interviews, and other pageant activities determine the nineteen semifinalists who will advance for the first cut. The Country of the Year award, determined through public voting, was reinstated after being introduced in 2020; the winner of which will complete the twenty semi-finalists. The twenty semi-finalists competed at the sportswear competition.

Eventually, nine semi-finalists, including the winner of the Miss Popular vote which was determined through public voting, completed the ten semi-finalists that will compete at the long gown, and speech competitions. Afterward, the five finalists were chosen. The remainder of the top ten were enthroned as fifth runners-up on the occasion of celebrating the tenth anniversary of the pageant.

=== Selection committee ===
Preliminary competition

- Atalarik Syach – Indonesian actor
- Syarifah Rahma – Indonesian economic and business anchor
- Devya Lina – Indonesian dentist
- Dessy Ruhati – Director of National and International Events, Minister of Tourism and Creative Economy of Indonesia
- Janelee Chaparro – Miss Grand International 2013 from Puerto Rico
- Nguyễn Thúc Thùy Tiên – Miss Grand International 2021 from Vietnam
- Ivan Gunawan – Founder of Yayasan Dunia Mega Bintang
- Teresa Chaivisut – Vice president of Miss Grand International Organization
- Nawat Itsaragrisil – President of Miss Grand International Organization

== Contestants ==
Sixty-eight contestants competed for the title.

Country/Territory	Delegate	Age (Note: Ages at the time of the pageant)	Hometown
Angola	Teresa Sara	25	Luanda
Argentina	Camila Barraza	29	Buenos Aires
Australia	Amber Sidney	25	Melbourne
Bangladesh	Towhida Tusnim Tifa	24	Gazipur
Belarus	Marina Viazankova	28	Minsk
Belgium	Chiara Vanderveeren	27	Brussels
Bolivia	Camila Sanabria	27	Santa Cruz
Brazil	Isabella Menin	26	Marília
Cambodia	Pichvotey Saravody	23	Preah Sihanouk
Canada	Mildred Rincon	26	Calgary
Chile	Karina Pérez	24	Santiago
China	Shirley Yu	27	Shanghai
Colombia	Priscilla Londoño	28	Houston
Costa Rica	Brenda Muñoz	28	Guanacaste
Crimea	Yuliia Pavlikova	29	Kerch
Cuba	Fabien Laurencio	28	Miami
Curaçao	Kanisha Sluis	26	Willemstad
Czech Republic	Mariana Bečková	23	Prague
Denmark	Victoria Theilvig	19	Herlev
Dominican Republic	Jearmanda Ramos	22	Puerto Plata
Ecuador	Lisseth Naranjo	24	Guayaquil
El Salvador	Noor Mohamed	21	San Salvador
France	Lucie Carbone	24	Côte d'Azur
Germany	Kim Kelly Braun	27	Mannheim
Ghana	Zahara-Imani Bossman	20	Accra
Guatemala	Andrea Radford	27	Guatemala City
Haiti	Paul Anne Estima	21	Port-au-Prince
Honduras	Saira Cacho	21	Tegucigalpa
Hong Kong	Chan Mei To	27	Hong Kong
India	Praachi Nagpal	24	Hyderabad
Indonesia	Andina Julie	21	Muara Enim
(Republic of Ireland) Ireland	Peace Olaniyi	28	Dublin
Italy	Miriam Malerba	18	Apulia
Jamaica	Kim-Marie Spence	23	Saint Elizabeth
Japan	Seira Inoue	26	Tokyo
Laos	Phoutsavanh Vongkhamxao	25	Vientiane
Malaysia	Charissa Chong	27	Subang Jaya
Mauritius	Yuvna Gookool	22	Grand Port
Mexico	Laysha Salazar	20	Hermosillo
Mongolia	Elena Egorova	25	Yakutia
Mozambique	Suema Abdul Rachid	25	Montepuez
Myanmar	Ei Ei Aung Htunt	24	Tak
Nepal	Aishworya Shrestha	25	Kathmandu
Netherlands	Marit Beets	22	Volendam
Nicaragua	Maycrin Jáenz	23	Granada
Nigeria	Damilola Bolarinde	25	Lagos
Pakistan	Aneesa Sheikh	19	Bloomfield Hill
Panama	Laura de Sanctis	26	Panama City
Paraguay	Agatha León	21	Ciudad del Este
Peru	Janet Leyva	25	Callao
Philippines	Roberta Tamondong	20	San Pablo
Poland	Natalia Gryglewska	24	Częstochowa
Portugal	Sabrina Gladio	27	Lisbon
Puerto Rico	Oxana Rivera	27	Dorado
Russia	Ekaterina Astashenkova	24	Vladivostok
Singapore	Emilbiany Nenggal Intong	24	Singapore
South Africa	LuJuan Mzyk	22	Pretoria
South Korea	Juyeon Lee	25	Seoul
Spain	Hirisley Jiménez	20	Caibarién
Sri Lanka	Nihari Perera	22	Colombo
Thailand	Engfa Waraha	27	Uthai Thani
Turkey	Deria Koc	28	Schwabach
Uganda	Oliver Nakakande	27	Bombo
Ukraine	Olga Vasyliv	22	Ivano-Frankivsk
United Kingdom	Sofia Mayers	22	Kent
United States	Emily Rose DeMure	24	Boulder
Venezuela	Luiseth Materán	26	Los Teques
Vietnam	Thiên Ân Ðoàn	22	Long An
