= Đoàn Thiên Ân =

Vietnamese model and beauty queen

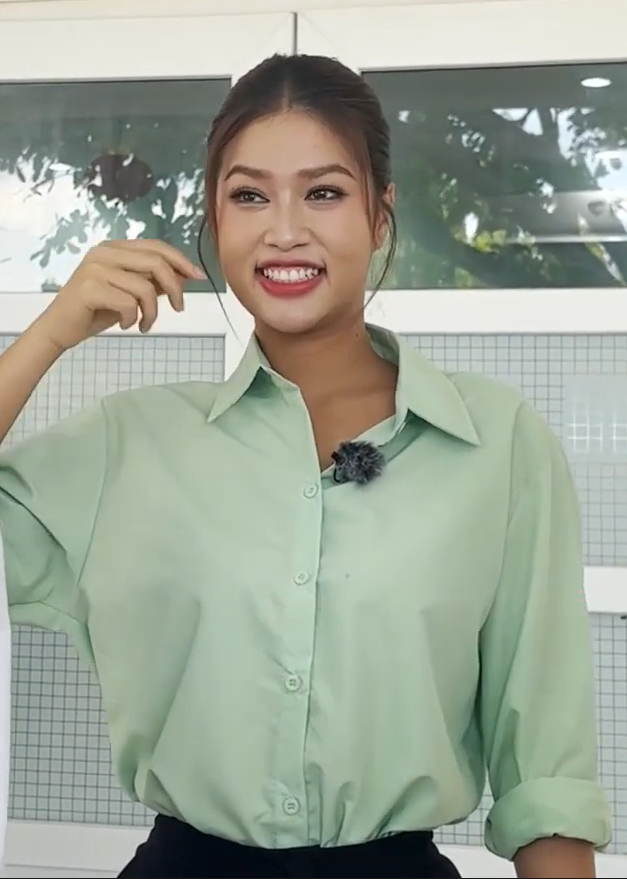
- Ân in 2023
- Born: Đoàn Thiên Ân; April 13, 2000 (age 26); Long An, Vietnam
- Education: Industrial University of Ho Chi Minh City
- Beauty pageant titleholder
- Title: Miss Grand Vietnam 2022
- Major competitions: Miss Aodai Student Vietnam 2018 (Winner); Miss Grand Vietnam 2022; (Winner); Miss Grand International 2022; (Top 20)

Đoàn Thiên Ân (born April 13, 2000) is a Vietnamese model and beauty queen who was crowned Miss Grand Vietnam 2022, represented Vietnam in the Top 20 of Miss Grand International 2022 and won "Country's Power of The Year" Award.

== Background ==
Ân was born in 2000 in Long An, and is a student of tourism at Industrial University of Ho Chi Minh City. In her childhood, she had to work to earn money to support her family and go to school. Ân was once said to weigh 75 kg and was a victim of body shaming.

== Career ==
=== Miss Aodai Student Vietnam 2018 ===
Ân first participated in a beauty contest and was crowned Miss Aodai Student Vietnam 2018. Besides that, she also brought home the "Talented Female Student" subsidiary award.

=== Miss Grand Vietnam 2022 ===
Ân participated in and won the crown of Miss Grand Vietnam 2022 held for the first time at Phú Thọ Indoor Stadium.

Awards and achievements
Preceded by (Cambodia) Chily Tevy	Country's Power of The Year; 2022	Succeeded by (Myanmar) Ni Ni Lin Eain
Preceded by Nguyễn Đặng Thanh Hằng	Miss Aodai Student Vietnam; 2018	Succeeded by Đỗ Hà Trang
Preceded by Nguyễn Thúc Thùy Tiên	Miss Grand Vietnam; 2022	Succeeded by Lê Hoàng Phương
