= Miss Grand Guadeloupe =

Guadeloupe beauty pageant title

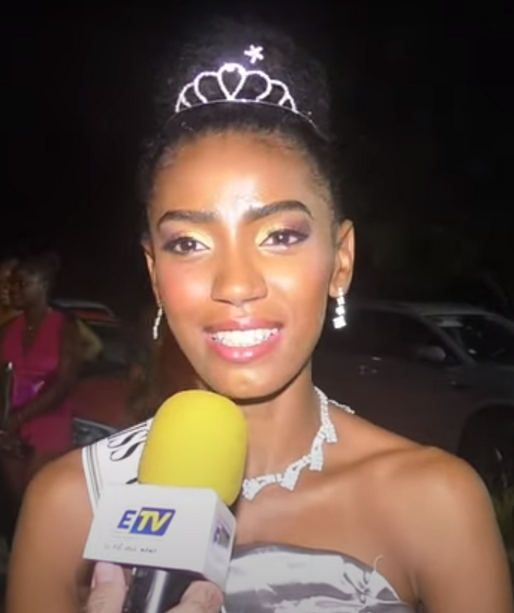
- Laura Ballonad, Miss Grand Guadeloupe 2023
- Formation: 2013
- Type: Beauty pageant
- Headquarters: Pointe-à-Pitre
- Location: Guadeloupe
- Members: Miss Grand International; Miss Grand France
- Official language: French
- National director: Georges Nandan

Miss Grand Guadeloupe is a national beauty pageant title awarded to Guadeloupe representatives who competed at the national event, Miss Grand France, or an international stage of Miss Grand International. The title was first awarded in 2013 to a 22-year-old from Le Moule, Orphelie Morti, who then competed in the international event in Thailand. In 2013 and from 2017 to 2019, the right to send Guadeloupe representatives to Miss Grand International belonged to the national pageant of Miss International Guadeloupe, headed by Georges Nandan.

Guadeloupe joined the Miss Grand International pageant four times, but all of its representatives were unplaced.

== History ==
Guadeloupe made its debut in Miss Grand International in 2013 when Orphelie Morti was appointed by Georges Nandan, the director of Miss International Guadeloupe pageant, to compete in the Miss Grand International 2014 pageant in Thailand, and then no Guadeloupe candidates in the pageant from 2014 to 2016.

After three consecutive years of absence, Guadeloupe competed in Miss Grand International again in 2017, after the organizer of the Miss International Guadeloupe pageant obtained the license and the title of Miss Grand Guadeloupe was considered one of the supplemental titles in that year's pageant, in which it was delivered to Krystel Landry, who then competed at Miss Grand International 2017 in Vietnam, but was unplaced. The contract between the mentioned national organizer and MGI PCL was discontinued at the end of 2019. Since then, as of 2023, no Guadeloupe candidate has competed at the Miss Grand International, despite the title of Miss Grand Guadeloupe being awarded annually; the titleholders were not sent to compete internationally.

== National and international competition ==
From 2013 and 2017 to 2019, the runners-up of Miss International Guadeloupe were sent to compete internationally in Miss Grand International. Later in 2024, Guadeloupe sent its representative to participate in Miss Grand France, as detailed below.

Year	Representative	Original national title	National/International pageant		National director	Ref.
Year	Representative	Original national title	Pageant	Result	National director	Ref.
2013	Orphelie Morti	Appointed	Miss Grand International 2013	Unplaced	Georges Nandan	
2017	Krystel Landry	Miss International Guadeloupe 2017 – Grand	Miss Grand International 2017	Unplaced	Georges Nandan	
2018	Meghan Monrose	Miss International Guadeloupe 2013 – International	Miss Grand International 2018	Unplaced	Georges Nandan	
2019	Nahémi Ceriac	Miss International Guadeloupe 2019 – Grand	Miss Grand International 2019	Unplaced	Georges Nandan	
2021	Lisa Beauperthuy	Miss International Guadeloupe 2021 – Grand	Miss Grand International 2021	Did not compete	Georges Nandan	
2023	Laura Ballonad	Miss International Guadeloupe 2023 – Grand	Miss Grand International 2023	Did not compete	Georges Nandan	
2024	Alexandra Gradel	Appointed	Miss Grand France 2024	Top 12	Self-dominated	
