= Miss Grand United Kingdom =

National beauty pageant in the United Kingdom

- Established: 5 September 2015; 11 years ago
- Founder: Holly Louise
- Type: Beauty pageant
- Headquarters: London
- Location: United Kingdom
- Members: Miss Grand International
- Official language: English
- President: Daniela Costin
- Website: MissGrandUK.com

Miss Grand United Kingdom is a national beauty pageant that selects the United Kingdom's representative for the Miss Grand International pageant. Founded in 2015 by Holly Louise, the competition is currently organized by Daniela Costin. The winner represents the four constituent countries of the United Kingdom at the international competition.

Since making its debut at Miss Grand International in 2013, the United Kingdom has yet to win the international title but has placed among the Top 20 finalists five times—in 2014, 2016, 2020, 2022 and 2025. The country has also won the Best Evening Gown and Best National Costume awards in 2016 and 2022, respectively.

== History ==
The United Kingdom first participated in Miss Grand International in 2013. For the first two editions held in Thailand, its representatives were appointed rather than selected through a national pageant. Georgia Smith, the 2014 representative, became the first British delegate to place at the international competition. Following this, Holly Louise, director of UK Power Pageant, acquired the licenses for England, Scotland, and Wales and founded Miss Grand United Kingdom in 2015. The inaugural edition was held at Oxford Town Hall in Oxford on 5 September, featuring 20 finalists. Elizabeth Greenham, Taylor Stringfellow, and Danielle Latimer were crowned Miss Grand England, Miss Grand Scotland, and Miss Grand Wales, respectively.

From 2016 to 2019, the Miss Grand United Kingdom titleholder was selected through the UK Power Pageant, which also chose the country's representatives for Miss International and Miss Intercontinental. During this period, Ashleigh Coyle, a 21-year-old Derry-based model and runner-up of Big Brother UK Series 15, was elected Miss Grand Northern Ireland 2017 but did not compete at the international pageant in Vietnam for undisclosed reasons.

After Holly Louise was unable to send the elected delegates to the 2019 international contest in Venezuela because of safety concerns, the national franchise was transferred to Megan Darlington in 2020. Darlington subsequently organized the pageant independently in 2021. The franchise was subsequently transferred to Kathryn Fanshawe in 2022, before Daniela Costin assumed the national franchise in 2025.

== Editions ==
The following list presents the details of each edition of the Miss Grand United Kingdom contest since its establishment in 2015.

=== Date and venue ===
| Edition | Date | Final venue | Entrants | Ref. |
|---|---|---|---|---|
| 1st | 5 September 2015 | The Oxford Town Hall, Oxford | 20 | |
| 2nd | 5 September 2021 | The Joe Longthorne Theatre, Blackpool | 16 | |
| 3rd | 13 August 2023 | The Aures London, London | 9 | |
| 4th | 17 May 2026 | Wyllyotts Theatre & Cinema, Potters Bar | 15 | |

=== Competition results ===
Since 2023, Miss Grand United Kingdom has elected a single national winner to represent the United Kingdom at Miss Grand International. Following the acquisition of the franchise by Daniela Costin in 2025, the competition entered a new era under the management of Pageants Planet Ltd, with Pooja Ghodekar becoming the first winner crowned under the new ownership in 2026.

| Edition | Miss Grand United Kingdom | Miss Grand England | Miss Grand Northern Ireland | Miss Grand Scotland | Miss Grand Wales | Ref. |
|---|---|---|---|---|---|---|
| 1st | Not awarded | Elizabeth Greenham (Greater London) | Not awarded | Taylor Stringfellow (Edinburgh) | Danielle Latimer (Rhondda Cynon Taf) | |
| 2nd | Not awarded | Jessica Ford (West Midlands) | Shannon McCullagh (Belfast) | Katie Finlay (Glasgow) | Heather Hopkins (Swansea) | |
| 3rd | Chloe Ellman-Baker (Sussex) | Not awarded | | | | |
| 4th | Pooja Ghodekar (London) | Not awarded | | | | |

== International competition ==
The following is a list of United Kingdom representatives at the Miss Grand International contest.

Color keys

- : Declared as the winner
- : Ended as a runner-up (Top 5)
- : Ended as a finalist (Top 10)
- : Ended as a semifinalist (Top 20/22)
- : Ended as special awards winner

| Year | Country | Hometown | Representative | National qualification | Placement | Special Awards |
|---|---|---|---|---|---|---|
| 2026 | United Kingdom | London | Pooja Ghodekar | Miss Grand United Kingdom 2026 | TBA | |
| 2025 | United Kingdom | Newcastle | Harriotte Lane | Appointed | Top 22 | |
| 2024 | United Kingdom | Grimsby | Amy Viranya Berry | Appointed | 2nd runner-up (Note: Originally named the 5th runner-up, but was later promoted to the 2nd runner-up following the dethronement and resignation of several 2024 top 5 finalists.) | |
| 2023 | United Kingdom | Sussex | Chloe Ellman-Baker | Miss Grand United Kingdom 2023 | Unplaced | |
| 2022 | United Kingdom | Kent | Sofia Mayers | Appointed | Top 20 | Best National Costume |
| 2021 | England | West Midlands | Jessica Ford | Miss Grand England 2021 | Did not compete | |
| 2021 | Northern Ireland | Belfast | Shannon McCullagh | Miss Grand Northern Ireland 2021 | Unplaced | |
| 2021 | Scotland | Edinburgh | Katie Finlay | Miss Grand Scotland 2021 | Did not compete | |
| 2021 | Wales | Swansea | Heather Hopkins | Miss Grand Wales 2021 | Did not compete | |
| 2020 | England | Poole | Stephanie Wyatt | Appointed | Top 20 | |
| 2020 | Northern Ireland | County Down | Amber Walsh | Appointed | Did not compete | |
| 2020 | Scotland | Coleraine | Helen Maher | Appointed | Unplaced | |
| 2020 | Wales | Surrey | Kathryn Fanshawe | Appointed | Unplaced | |
| 2019 | England | Lancashire | Ashleigh Wild | Miss Grand England 2019 | Did not compete | |
| 2019 | Scotland | Edinburgh | Freya Taylor | Miss Grand Scotland 2019 | Did not compete | |
| 2019 | Wales | Gwent | Emma Davies | Miss Grand Wales 2019 | Did not compete | |
| 2018 | England | London | Christina Baker | Miss Grand England 2018 | Unplaced | |
| 2018 | Scotland | Edinburgh | Olivia McPike | Miss Grand Scotland 2018 | Unplaced | |
| 2018 | Wales | Cardiff | Lauren Parkinson | Miss Grand Wales 2018 | Unplaced | |
| 2017 | England | Derby | Noky Simbani | Miss Grand England 2017 | Unplaced | |
| 2017 | Northern Ireland | Derry | Ashleigh Coyle | Miss Grand Northern Ireland 2017 | Did not compete | |
| 2017 | Scotland | Hamilton | Amy Meisak | Miss Grand Scotland 2017 | Unplaced | |
| 2017 | Wales | Llanelli | Nadia Suliman | Miss Grand Wales 2017 | Unplaced | |
| 2016 | England | Sutton-in-Ashfield | Cherelle Patterson | Miss Grand England 2016 | Unplaced | Best Evening Gown |
| 2016 | Scotland | Aberfoyle | Gemma Palmer | Miss Grand Scotland 2016 | Unplaced | |
| 2016 | Wales | Cardiff | Rachael Tate | Miss Grand Wales 2016 | Top 20 | |
| 2015 | England | Wallasey | Elizabeth Greenham | Miss Grand England 2015 | Unplaced | |
| 2015 | Scotland | Glasgow | Taylor Stringfellow | Miss Grand Scotland 2015 | Unplaced | |
| 2015 | Wales | Barry | Danielle Latimer | Miss Grand Wales 2015 | Unplaced | |
| 2014 | United Kingdom | Liverpool | Georgia Smith | Appointed | Top 20 | |
| 2013 | England | Liverpool | Julie Montague | Appointed | Unplaced | |
| 2013 | Wales | Cardiff | Sophie Hall | Appointed | Unplaced | |

== Gallery ==
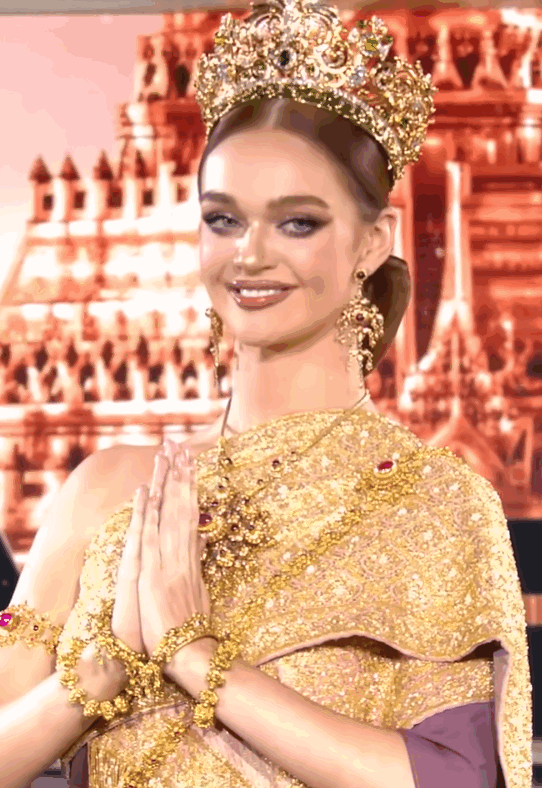
Miss Grand United Kingdom 2025
Harriotte Lane

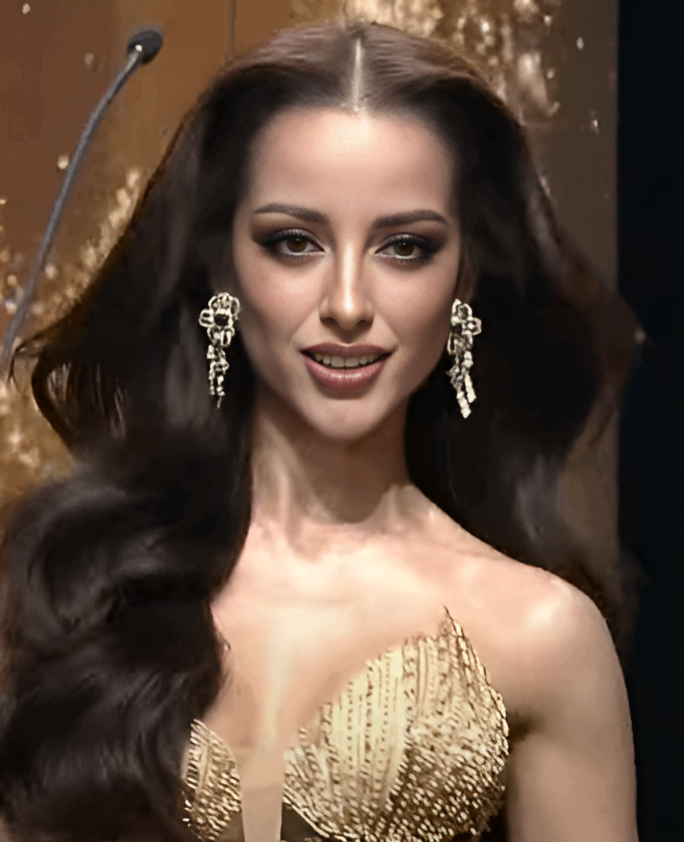
Miss Grand United Kingdom 2024
Amy Viranya Berry

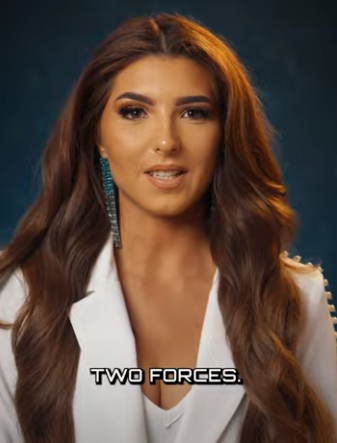
Miss Grand United Kingdom 2023
Chloe Ellman-Baker

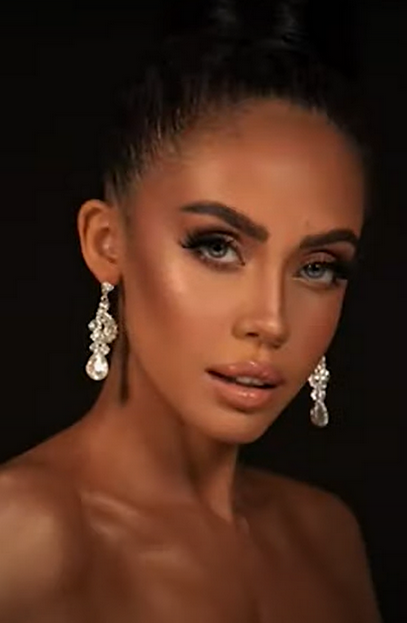
Miss Grand United Kingdom 2022
Sofia Mayers

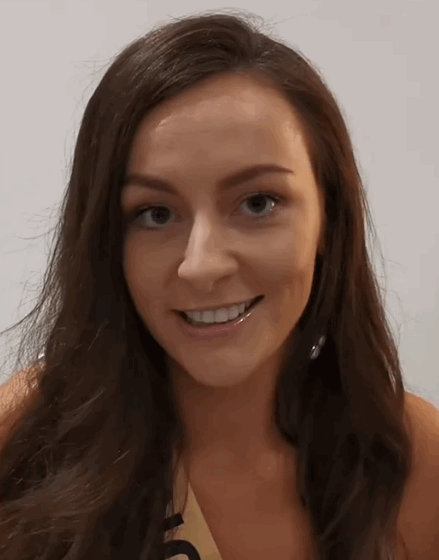
Miss Grand Northern Ireland 2021
Shannon McCullagh

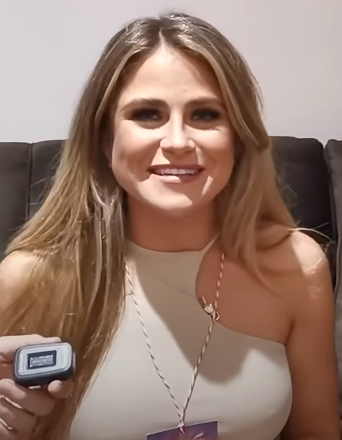
Miss Grand Wales 2020
Kathryn Fanshawe

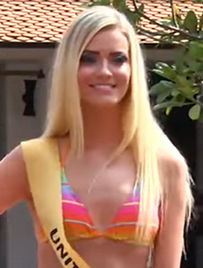
Miss Grand United Kingdom 2014
Georgia Smith

== National pageant candidates ==
The following list is the national finalists of the Miss Grand United Kingdom pageant, as well as the competition results.

| Represented | 1st | 2nd | 3rd | 4th |
|---|---|---|---|---|
| Antrim | | Y | | |
| Belfast | | | | |
| Berkshire | | Y | | |
| Bicester | | | | Y |
| Birmingham | | | Y | |
| Bridgend | | Y | | |
| Briston | | | | Y |
| Cardiff | | Y | | |
| Central London | | | | |
| Cheshire | | | | |
| County Durham | | | Y | |
| Crickhowell | | | | Y |
| Derbyshire | | Y | Y | |
| Devon | | | | Y |
| East Midlands | | | | |
| Edinburgh | | | | |
| Glasgow | | Y | | |
| Greater Glasgow | | | | Y |
| Greater London | | | | Y |
| Greenwich | | | | Y |
| Kensington and Chelsea | | | | |
| Kent | | Y | | Y |
| Leeds | | Y | | |
| Liverpool | | | | Y |
| London | | Y | | |
| Manchester | | Y | | |
| North East England | | Y | | |
| North London | | | | |
| Norwich | | | | |
| Oxford | | | | Y |
| People's Choice | | | | |
| Rhondda Cynon Taf | | | | |
| Scotland | | | Y | |
| Sussex | | | | |
| Swansea | | | | |
| West Midlands | | | | |
| Westminster | | | | |
| Yorkshire | | Y | | |
| Total | 20 | 16 | 9 | 15 |
Color keys: : Declared as the winner; : Ended as a 1st runner-up; : Ended as a 2nd runner-up; : Ended as a 3rd runner-up; : Ended as a 4th runner-up; : Ended as a 5th runner-up; A : Ended as a finalist, semifinalist and unplaced; × : Ended as withdrew during the competition; × : Ended as no representative
