= Miss Grand United Kingdom 2026 =

4th edition of Miss Grand United Kingdom competition

- Date: 17 May 2026
- Venue: Wyllyotts Theatre & Cinema, Potters Bar
- Entrants: 15
- Placements: 5
- Debuts: Bicester; Briston; Central London; Cheshire; Crickhowell; Devon; East Midlands; Greater Glasgow; Greenwich; Liverpool; Oxford; People's Choice; Westminster
- Withdrawals: Birmingham; County Durham; Derbyshire; Kensington and Chelsea; North London; Norwich; Scotland; Sussex
- Returns: Kent
- Winner: Pooja Ghodekar (Central London)

External videos
- Miss Grand United Kingdom 2026 Finals
- 2026 Miss Grand United Kingdom Finals by Crown Circle UK

Miss Grand United Kingdom 2026 was the fourth edition of the Miss Grand United Kingdom pageant, held on 17 May 2026, at the Wyllyotts Theatre & Cinema, Potters Bar. Fifteen contestants from across the United Kingdom competed for the title.

At the end of the event, Pooja Ghodekar of Central London was crowned Miss Grand United Kingdom 2026. She will represent the United Kingdom at the Miss Grand International 2026 pageant, to be held in India in October 2026.

== Results ==
Placement	Contestant
Miss Grand United Kingdom 2026	Central London – Pooja Ghodekar
1st Runner-up	People's Choice – Chloe Lake
2nd Runner-up	East Midlands – Topaz Williamson
3rd Runner-up	Cheshire – Philippa Bateman
4th Runner-up	Westminster – Angel Rae

== Contestants ==
Fifteen contestants competed for the title.

- Bicester – Aisha Nankaja
- Briston – Kateryna Kalinina
- Central London – Pooja Ghodekar
- Cheshire – Philippa Bateman
- Crickhowell – Estefania Mcdermot
- Devon – Tia Schofield
- East Midlands – Topaz Williamson
- Greater Glasgow – Elisaveta Tikhonova
- Greater London – Fatima Liyu
- Greenwich – Krupa Kosambiya
- Kent – Stephanie Balogun
- Liverpool – Candy Sagbasan
- Oxford – Alba Andreina Ruiz
- People's Choice – Chloe Lake
- Westminster – Angel Rae
