= Miss Grand France 2024 =

6th edition of the Miss Grand France beauty pageant

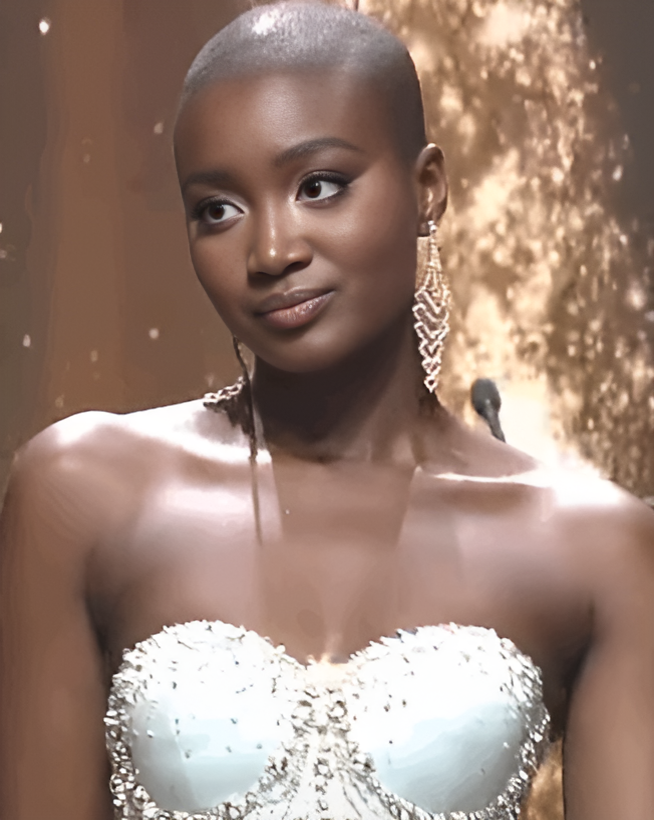
- Safiétou Kabengele, the winner of the contest
- Date: 8 May 2024
- Presenters: Matthieu Moille; Elisa Mysyshyne
- Venue: Theater of Longjumeau, Longjumeau
- Broadcaster: YouTube
- Entrants: 17
- Placements: 12
- Withdrawals: Alsace; Bordeaux; Medoc
- Returns: Aquitaine; Auvergne; Paris
- Winner: Safiétou Kabengele (Normandy)
- Photogenic: Ambre Florent (Paris)

External videos
- Miss Grand France 2024 Finals
- 2024 Miss Grand France Finals by Celest Productions

Miss Grand France 2024 was the 6th edition of the Miss Grand France pageant, held on 8 May 2024, at the Theater of Longjumeau, Paris. Contestants from seventeen regions of France competed for the title, of whom a 26-year-old French-Senegalese model representing Normandy, Safiétou Kabengele, was named the winner. Kabengele later represented France at the Miss Grand International 2024 pageant in Bangkok, Thailand, and was named the third runner-up.

The event featured the presence of Miss Grand International 2023, Luciana Fuster of Peru as well as the president of the international parent stage, Nawat Itsaragrisil. Moreover, former first runner-up of Miss Grand France 2023 who is of Ivorian descent, Aya Kadjo, was also announced as the representative of Ivory Coast for Miss Grand International 2024 in the event.

The contest was hosted by Miss Universal Woman France 2024 Elisa Mysyshyne and an emcee Matthieu Moille.

== Background ==
=== Date and venue ===
The Miss Grand France 2024 was scheduled for 4–9 May 2024, with the preliminary competition on 5 May 2024, at the Hôtel Mercure Paris Montmartre Sacré-Coeur, and the final round on 8 May 2024, at the Theater of Longjumeau, Longjumeau.

=== Selection of participants ===
The national finalists for the Miss Grand France 2024 pageant were elected by regional licensees, who in some cases are responsible for more than one region, through the local pageant, casting, or hand-picking.

Only the region of Île-de-France organized a regional contest for this year's edition. The following table shows the regional representative selection details for the Miss Grand France 2024 pageant.

Number of		Host region	Title(s)	Total titles
Pageant	Title(s)	Host region	Title(s)	Total titles
1	2	Île-de-France	Miss Grand Île-de-France; Miss Grand Paris	2
Audition/Casting		Occitania	Miss Grand Occitania; Miss Grand Provence	2
Appointed		—	Other 18 regional titles	18
Total titles				22

== Result ==
Miss Grand France 2024 competition result by region
Color keys:

Winner 1st runner-up 2nd runner-up 3rd runner-up 4th runner-up	Top 12 Unplaced Withdrew No representative

Placement	Candidate
Miss Grand France 2024	Normandy – Safiétou Kabengele
1st runner-up	Aquitaine – Clémentine Albié
2nd runner-up	Martinique – Maeva Chambeau
3rd runner-up	Paris – Ambre Florent
4th runner-up	Brittany – Sarah Mandjou
Top 12	Antilles – Léna Vairac; Auvergne – Cléo Antignat; Guadeloupe – Alexandra Gradel; Île-de-France – Pauline Thimon; Maine-et-Loire – Elma Guilleux; Nord-Pas-de-Calais – Anais Legrand; Réunion– Kenia Nicol
Special awards
Best Body	Aquitaine – Clémentine Albié
Best Smile	Martinique - Maeva Chambeau
Best Catwalk	Île-de-France – Pauline Thimon
Best in Swimsuit	Normandy – Safietou Kabengele
Beautiful Eyes	Auvergne – Cléo Antignat
Miss Elegance	Brittany – Sarah Mandjou
Miss Popularity	Normandy – Safietou Kabengele
Miss Photogenic	Paris – Ambre Florent
Miss Social Media	Normandy – Safietou Kabengele

== Contestants ==
Initially, twenty-two candidates confirmed their participation, but five withdrew, making the finalized total of seventeen contestants.

- Antilles - Léna Vairac
- Aquitaine - Clémentine Albié
- Auvergne - Cléo Antignat
- Bretagne - Sarah Mandjou
- Champagne-Ardenne - Anne Djoba (withdrew)
- Communaute Etrangere - Judith Bonang (withdrew)
- Guadeloupe - Alexandra Gradel
- Île-de-France - Pauline Thimon
- Languedoc - Manuella Gritar
- Loire-Atlantique – Anna Jalia (withdrew)
- Maine-et-Loire - Elma Guilleux
- Martinique - Maëva Chambeau
- Nord-Pas-de-Calais - Anaïs Legrand
- Normandy - Safiétou Kabengele
- Occitanie - Chloé Maillot
- Paris - Ambre Florent
- Pays de la Loire - Malaury Turpin
- Picardie - Pauline Dubédat (withdrew)
- Poitou-Charentes - Lara Evaristo
- Provence - Ilona Cassiano
- Réunion – Kenya Nicol
- Rhône-Alpes – Jennifer Malleron (withdrew)
