= Miss Grand Tahiti =

Tahiti beauty pageant title

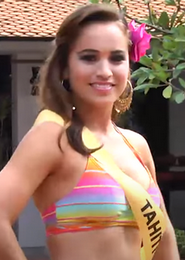
- Kohotu Ariitai, Miss Grand Tahiti 2014
- Formation: 2014
- Type: Beauty pageant
- Headquarters: Papeete
- Location: French Polynesia
- Members: Miss Grand International; Miss Grand France
- Official language: French

Miss Grand Tahiti is a national beauty pageant title awarded to Tahiti representatives who competed at the national event, Miss Grand France, or an international stage of Miss Grand International. The title was first awarded in 2014 when the 2nd runner-up Miss Tahiti 2014 was appointed to represent Tahiti at the Miss Grand International 2014 pageant in Thailand, followed by 1st runner-up Miss Tahiti 2016, Vaiata Buisson, who competed internationally in Miss Grand International 2016 in Las Vegas.

Tahiti joined the Miss Grand International pageant twice; in 2014 and 2016, but obtained placement only once, in 2016, by Vaiata Buisson.

== History ==
Tahiti made its debut in Miss Grand International in 2014, when Miss Tahiti acquired the license and appointed the 2014 2nd vice-miss, Kohotu Ariitai, to compete internationally in Thailand. However, Kohotu was unplaced, then no Tahiti delegate in the 2015 international edition.

Miss Tahiti competed in Miss Grand International again in 2016, represented by the 1st runner-up Miss Tahiti 2016, Vaiata Buisson, who qualified to the top 20 finalists in the international pageant held on October 25, in Las Vegas. Since then, no Tahiti candidates in Miss Grand International due to a lack of national licensees.

In 2019, a model Alicia Hoatua-Chave nominated herself as Tahiti representative for the Miss Grand France 2019 pageant, but was unplaced.

== National and international competition ==
In 2014 and 2016, the runners-up of Miss Tahiti were sent to compete internationally in Miss Grand International. Later in 2019, Tahiti sent its representative to participate in Miss Grand France, as detailed below.

Year	Representative	Original national title	National/International pageant		National director	Ref.
Year	Representative	Original national title	Pageant	Result	National director	Ref.
2014	Kohotu Ariitai	2nd runner-up Miss Tahiti 2014	Miss Grand International 2014	Unplaced	Leiana Faugerat	
2016	Vaiata Buisson	1st runner-up Miss Tahiti 2016	Miss Grand International 2016	Top 20	Leiana Faugerat	
2019	Alicia Hoatua-Chave	Appointed	Miss Grand France 2019	Unplaced	Self-dominated	
