= Miss Grand United Kingdom 2021 =

2nd Miss Grand United Kingdom competition

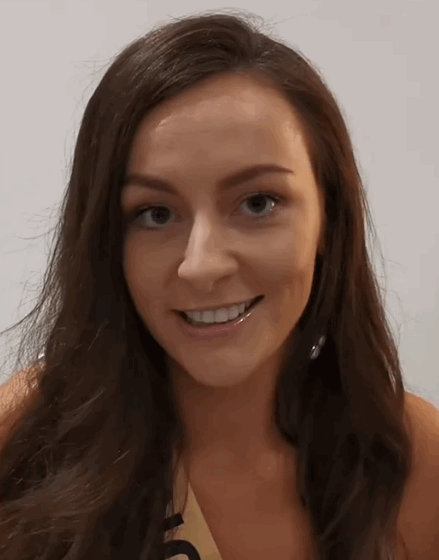
- Shannon McCullagh, one of the contest's winners
- Date: 5 September 2021
- Venue: Joe Longthorne Theatre, Blackpool
- Entrants: 16
- Placements: 10
- Winners: Jessica Ford (West Midlands); Shannon McCullagh (Belfast); Katie Finlay (Glasgow); Heather Hopkins (Swansea)

Miss Grand United Kingdom 2021 was the 2nd edition of the Miss Grand United Kingdom pageant, held to select the representatives of England, Northern Ireland, Scotland, and Wales for the Miss Grand International 2021 pageant. Its grand finale, in which 16 candidates participated, happened in Blackpool on 5 September 2021, at the Joe Longthorne Theatre.

At the end of the event, Jessica Ford of West Midlands, Shannon McCullagh of Belfast, Katie Finla of Glasgow, and Heather Hopkins of Swansea were named Miss Grand England, Northern Ireland, Scotland, and Wales, respectively. All four winners were set to compete internationally in Thailand, but three withdrew due to health concerns regarding the COVID-19 pandemic. Only Miss Northern Ireland Shannon McCullagh that was able to join the mentioned contest, but was unplaced.

The event was organized by Megan Darlington who served as the Miss Grand United Kingdom director from 2020 to 2021.

== Result ==
Title	Contestant
Miss Grand England 2021	West Midlands – Jessica Ford
Miss Grand Northern Ireland 2021	Belfast – Shannon McCullagh
Miss Grand Scotland 2021	Glasgow – Katie Finlay
Miss Grand Wales 2021	Swansea – Heather Hopkins
Top 10	No data available

== Contestants ==
Sixteen contestants competed for the titles.

Miss Grand England contestants	Miss Grand Northern Ireland contestants
Berkshire – Alina Green; Derbyshire – Deyonne Best; Kent – Tessa Zaire; Leeds – Sarah Boardman; London – Dilani Selvanathan; Manchester – Sunna Dogg Jonsdottir; North East England – Charlotte Gilmour; West Midlands – Jessica Ford; Yorkshire – Sophie Gilmour	Antrim – Kerry Kane; Belfast – Shannon Mc Cullagh
Berkshire – Alina Green; Derbyshire – Deyonne Best; Kent – Tessa Zaire; Leeds – Sarah Boardman; London – Dilani Selvanathan; Manchester – Sunna Dogg Jonsdottir; North East England – Charlotte Gilmour; West Midlands – Jessica Ford; Yorkshire – Sophie Gilmour	Miss Grand Scotland contestants
Berkshire – Alina Green; Derbyshire – Deyonne Best; Kent – Tessa Zaire; Leeds – Sarah Boardman; London – Dilani Selvanathan; Manchester – Sunna Dogg Jonsdottir; North East England – Charlotte Gilmour; West Midlands – Jessica Ford; Yorkshire – Sophie Gilmour	Glasgow – Katie Finlay; Edinburgh – Frankie Van Der Byl
Berkshire – Alina Green; Derbyshire – Deyonne Best; Kent – Tessa Zaire; Leeds – Sarah Boardman; London – Dilani Selvanathan; Manchester – Sunna Dogg Jonsdottir; North East England – Charlotte Gilmour; West Midlands – Jessica Ford; Yorkshire – Sophie Gilmour	Miss Grand Wales contestants
Berkshire – Alina Green; Derbyshire – Deyonne Best; Kent – Tessa Zaire; Leeds – Sarah Boardman; London – Dilani Selvanathan; Manchester – Sunna Dogg Jonsdottir; North East England – Charlotte Gilmour; West Midlands – Jessica Ford; Yorkshire – Sophie Gilmour	Bridgend – Emma Williams; Cardiff – Amie Barlow; Swansea – Heather Hopkins
