= Miss Grand Liberia =

Beauty pageant in Liberia

- Formation: August 10, 2021; 5 years ago
- Founder: Velegar Curry
- Type: Beauty pageant
- Headquarters: Monrovia
- Location: Liberia
- Official language: English
- National director: Velegar Curry (2021)
- Affiliations: Miss Grand International

Miss Grand Liberia was a national female beauty pageant in Liberia, headquartered in Monrovia. The competition was established in 2021 by Velegar Curry, a Liberian American based in Charlotte. The winner of the pageant was designated to represent Liberia at the affiliated international competition, Miss Grand International.

Since the inception of Miss Grand International, Liberia has participated only once, in 2021, when Hajamaya Mulbah represented the country; she did not achieve placement among the finalists.

== History ==
After obtaining the Miss Grand International license for Liberia in 2021, Velegar Curry launched applications for the national competition in June of that year, with the contest initially scheduled for August 2021. Owing to the COVID-19 pandemic, the event—featuring nine national finalists—was instead conducted virtually through the Zoom platform. The title was originally awarded to Goretti Itoka, a social media marketing strategist and former Miss Mano River Union; however, she was dethroned one month later and replaced by fellow finalist Hajamaya Mulbah.

== Edition ==
Miss Grand Liberia was organized as a stand-alone contest only once in 2021.

Year	Edition	Date	Final venue	Entrants	Winner	Ref.
2021	1st	10 August 2021	Virtual contest	9	Montserrado – Goretti Itoka	

== International competition ==
The following is a list of Ghanaian representatives at the Miss Grand International contest.

Year	Representative	Title	Placement	Special Award	National Director	Ref.
Did not compete since 2022
2021	Hajamaya Mulbah	Runner-up Miss Grand Liberia 2021	Unplaced	–	Velegar Curry	
2021	Goretti Itoka	Miss Grand Liberia 2021	Dethroned		Velegar Curry	
Did not compete from 2013 to 2020

== Scandal ==
In 2021, approximately one month following her coronation as Miss Grand Liberia, Goretti Itoka was supplanted by fellow finalist Hajamaya Mulbah. The organizing committee publicly stated that Itoka had voluntarily relinquished the title on account of health concerns. Itoka, however, later refuted this claim, asserting that her removal had occurred without prior notice or adequate justification. The Ministry of Information, Cultural Affairs, and Tourism of Liberia (MICAT) subsequently intervened in an attempt to mediate the situation, issuing formal correspondence to the organizing body, though no official response was ever recorded. In lieu of reinstatement, Itoka was extended an invitation to represent Liberia at Miss Grand International 2022, an offer which she ultimately declined.
