= Miss Grand United Kingdom 2023 =

3rd edition of Miss Grand United Kingdom competition

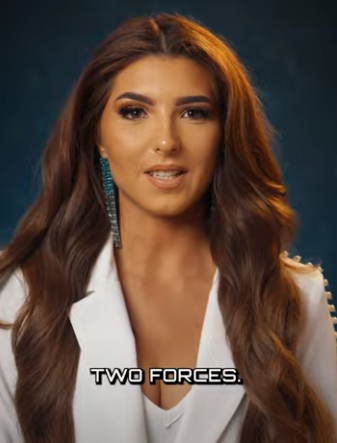
- Chloe Ellman-Baker, the winner of the contest
- Date: 13 August 2023
- Venue: Aures London, London
- Entrants: 9
- Placements: 5
- Debuts: Birmingham; Durham; Kensington and Chelsea; North London; Norwich; Scotland; Sussex
- Withdrawals: Berkshire; Kent; Leeds; London; Manchester; North East England; West Midlands; Yorkshire; Antrim; Belfast; Edinburgh; Glasgow; Bridgend; Cardiff; Swansea
- Returns: Greater London
- Winner: Chloe Ellman-Baker (Sussex)

Miss Grand United Kingdom 2023 was the third edition of the Miss Grand United Kingdom pageant, held on 13 August 2023, at the Aures London, London. Five finalists, who qualified for the national final through the preliminary contest arranged on 16 July, competed for the title, of whom a 23-year-old marketing manager representing Sussex, Chloe Ellman-Baker, was announced the winner. Baker later represented the United Kingdom at Miss Grand International 2023, held in Vietnam on 25 October of that year, but was unplaced.

Only one winner was crowned in this year's contest, unlike the previous two editions in which the representatives of England, Northern Ireland, Scotland, and Wales were selected.

This edition was the first Miss Grand United Kingdom contest organized by Kathryn Fanshawe after acquiring the license in 2022. The pageant's grand final round was also attended by Miss Grand Gibraltar 2023, Jaylynn Cruz.

== Result ==
Placement	Delegates
Miss Grand United Kingdom 2023	Sussex – Chloe Ellman-Baker
1st Runner-up	Greater London – Candy Paasche
2nd Runner-up	North London – Annette Adler
3rd Runner-up	Norwich – Brooke Nicola Smith
4th Runner-up	Kensington and Chelsea – Emily Cossey

== Candidates ==
Nine candidates competed for the title but only five qualified for the national final round.

- Birmingham – Sunna Dogg Jonsdottir
- County Durham – Aimee Whitton
- Derbyshire – Deyonne Best
- Greater London – Candy Paasche
- Kensington and Chelsea – Emily Cossey
- North London – Annette Adler
- Norwich – Brooke Nicola Smith
- Scotland – Afton McKeith
- Sussex – Chloe Ellman-Baker
