= Miss Grand Switzerland =

Swiss beauty pageant title

- Formation: 2013
- Type: Beauty pageant
- Headquarters: Genève
- Location: Switzerland
- Members: Miss Grand International
- Official language: German; French
- National director: Fred G.
- Parent organization: Miss World Switzerland (2013–2014); Miss Suisse Francophone (2016); Grand Swiss Woman (2023–2024); Miss Grand Switzerland (2026)
- Website: Official site

Sarah Louisa Rohrer, 2026 titleholder

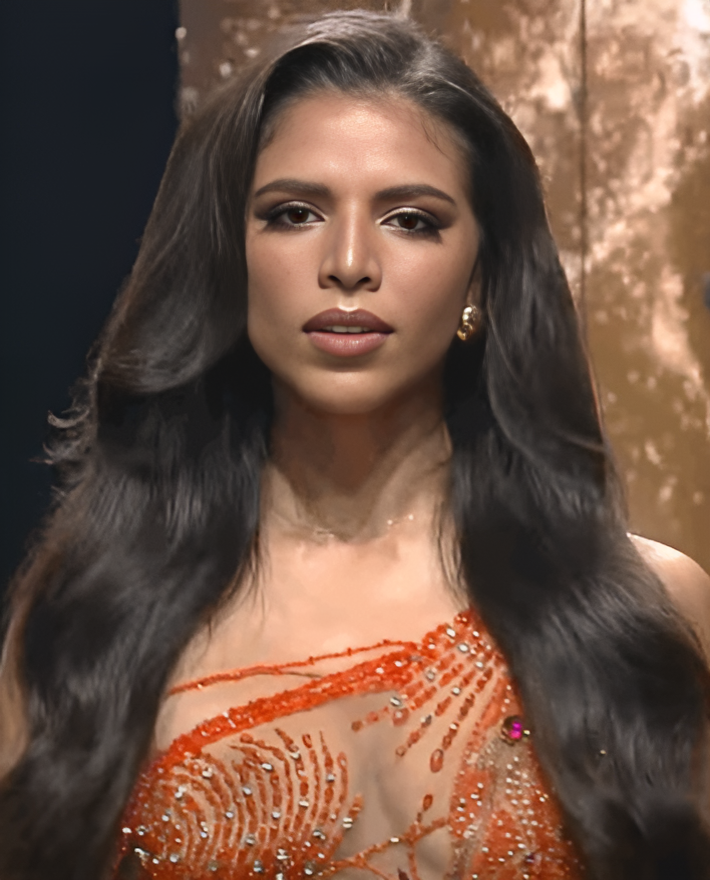
Dalia Kramer, 2024 titleholder

Miss Grand Switzerland is a national beauty pageant title awarded to Swiss representatives chosen to compete at the Miss Grand International pageant. It was first awarded in 2013 to a 17-year-old service assistant from Bern, Cynthia Montchong, who was previously the vice-Miss World Switzerland 2013. From 2013 to 2014, the right to send Swiss candidates for Miss Grand International belonged to HBC Entertainment GmbH, the Miss World Switzerland organizer headquartered in Wettingen, and then was granted by a Fribourg-based national pageant, Miss & Mister Suisse Francophone, in 2016.

Since the establishment of the international contest of Miss Grand International, Switzerland only participated twice; in 2013 and 2016. However, both representatives failed to qualify for the top 20 round.

== History ==
After a Wettingen-based event management company, HBC Entertainment GmbH, chaired by a Thai-Swiss businessperson, Saiphin Aeberli. purchased the licenses of Miss Grand Switzerland and Miss World Switzerland in 2013, the national contest of Miss World Switzerland 2013 was then held on August 24 at the Lecture Hall of the Kunsthaus Zürich. The contest's main winner was sent to Miss World 2013, while the first runner-up, Cynthia Montchong, was later assigned to join the inaugural edition of Miss Grand International in Thailand; however, Cynthia received a non-placement in the mentioned contest.

Later in 2014, the national contest of Miss World Switzerland was also held; its vice-miss, Dijana Cvijetic, was set to compete at the Miss Grand International 2014 pageant in Thailand. However, Miss World Switzerland 2014 winner Aline Morger resigned from the title for undisclosed reasons, causing Dijana to automatically take over the title, resulting in no Swiss representative at Miss Grand International that year, and the license was also not renewed in 2015.

In 2016, another national pageant, Miss & Mister Suisse Francophone, purchased the license. Its 2016 female category winner, Ambre Chavaillaz, originally was set for Miss World 2016, was sent to Miss Grand International 2016 in Las Vegas instead; however, Ambre was unplaced in the international competition. After the Miss & Mister Suisse Francophone organizer became the licensee of Miss Supranational for Switzerland in 2017, the Miss Grand contract was discontinued.

== International competition ==
The following is a list of Swiss representatives at the Miss Grand International contest.

Year	Representative	National qualification	Competition performance		National director
Year	Representative	National qualification	Placement	Other awards	National director
2013	Cynthia Montchong	1st runner-up Miss World Switzerland 2013	Unplaced	—	Saiphin Aeberli
2014	Dijana Cvijetic	1st runner-up Miss World Switzerland 2014	Unable to compete		Saiphin Aeberli
2015	No representative				
2016	Ambre Chavaillaz	Miss Suisse Francophone 2016	Unplaced	—	Ferdi Avmedoski
2017—2022: No representatives
2023	Marine Sayard	Grand Swiss Woman 2023	Unplaced	—	Fred G.
2024	Dalia Kramer	Grand Swiss Woman 2024	Unplaced	—	Fred G.
2025	No representative				
2026	Sarah-Louisa Rohrer	Miss Grand Switzerland	unplaced		SLR Swiss
