= Amy Viranya Berry =

British-Thai model and beauty queen (born 1998)

- เอมี่ วิรัญญา เบอร์รี่
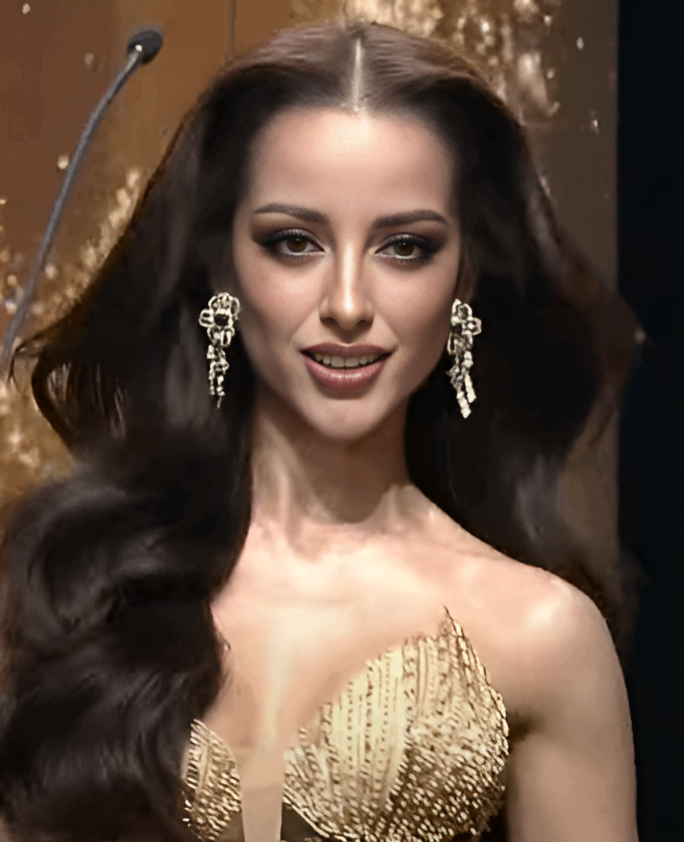
- Berry in 2024
- Born: 13 March 1998 (age 28)
- Occupation: Model
- Beauty pageant titleholder
- Title: Miss Grand United Kingdom 2024
- Years active: 2024–present
- Hair color: Dark brown
- Eye color: Dark brown
- Major competitions: Miss Grand Buriram 2024; (Winner); Miss Grand Thailand 2024; (Top 20); Miss Grand International 2024; (2nd Runner-Up)

Amy Viranya Berry (Thai: เอมี่ วิรัญญา เบอร์รี่; born 13 March 1998) is a British-Thai model and beauty queen who was crowned Miss Grand United Kingdom 2024. She represented the United Kingdom at the Miss Grand International 2024 pageant, where she achieved the position of fifth runner-up and was later elevated to second runner-up.

== Early life and career ==
Berry was born to an English father and Thai mother. Prior to her involvement in pageantry, she worked as a model.

== Pageantry ==
=== Miss Grand Buriram 2024 ===
In 2024, Berry competed in the Miss Grand Buriram pageant in Thailand, where she was crowned the winner. This victory qualified her to participate in the Miss Grand Thailand 2024 competition.

=== Miss Grand Thailand 2024 ===
Representing Buriram, Berry competed in the Miss Grand Thailand 2024 pageant and placed in the Top 20. Her performance in this national competition garnered attention and set the stage for her subsequent appointment as Miss Grand United Kingdom 2024.

=== Miss Grand International 2024 ===
Following her appointment as Miss Grand United Kingdom 2024, Berry represented the United Kingdom at the Miss Grand International 2024 pageant held in Bangkok, Thailand. She achieved the position of 5th runner-up, marking a significant accomplishment for the United Kingdom in the international pageant arena.

She was later elevated to the title of 2nd runner-up following several dethronements and resignations.

== Personal life ==
In addition to her modeling and pageant career, Berry is known for her advocacy on issues related to cultural diversity and inclusion. She uses her platform to inspire and empower individuals from diverse backgrounds.

Awards and achievements
Preceded by (Myanmar) Thae Su Nyein (Dethroned)	2nd Runner-up Miss Grand International (Assumed); 2024	Succeeded by (Spain) Aitana Jiménez
Preceded by Chloe Ellman-Baker	Miss Grand United Kingdom; 2024	Succeeded by Harriotte Lane
