= Miss Grand International 2024 =

12th Miss Grand International competition, beauty pageant edition

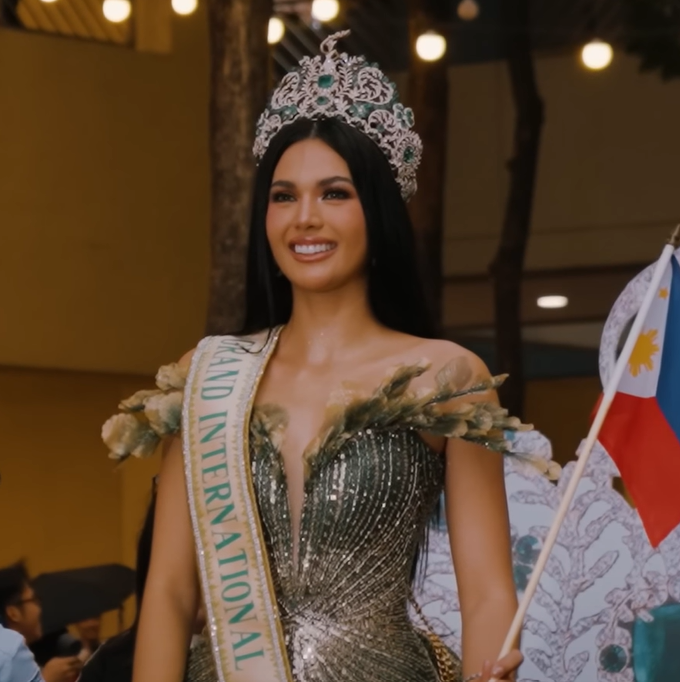
- CJ Opiaza
- Date: 25 October 2024
- Presenters: Matthew Deane
- Venue: MGI Hall, Bangkok, Thailand
- Broadcaster: YouTube
- Entrants: 68
- Placements: 20
- Debuts: Greenland
- Withdrawals: Belarus; Bonaire; Cambodia; Costa Rica; Greece; Hong Kong; Ireland; Romania; Seychelles; Turkey; Ukraine; Uzbekistan
- Returns: Armenia; Bangladesh; Cameroon; China; Côte d'Ivoire; Curaçao; Macau; New Zealand; Pakistan; Tanzania
- Winner: CJ Opiaza; Philippines
- Best National Costume: Talita Hartmann (Brazil); María José Vera (Ecuador); Yariela García (Honduras)
- Best in Swimsuit: Talita Hartmann (Brazil)
- Best in Evening Gown: Sage-La'Parriea Yakubu (Ghana)

External videos
- Grand final competition
- Preliminary competition

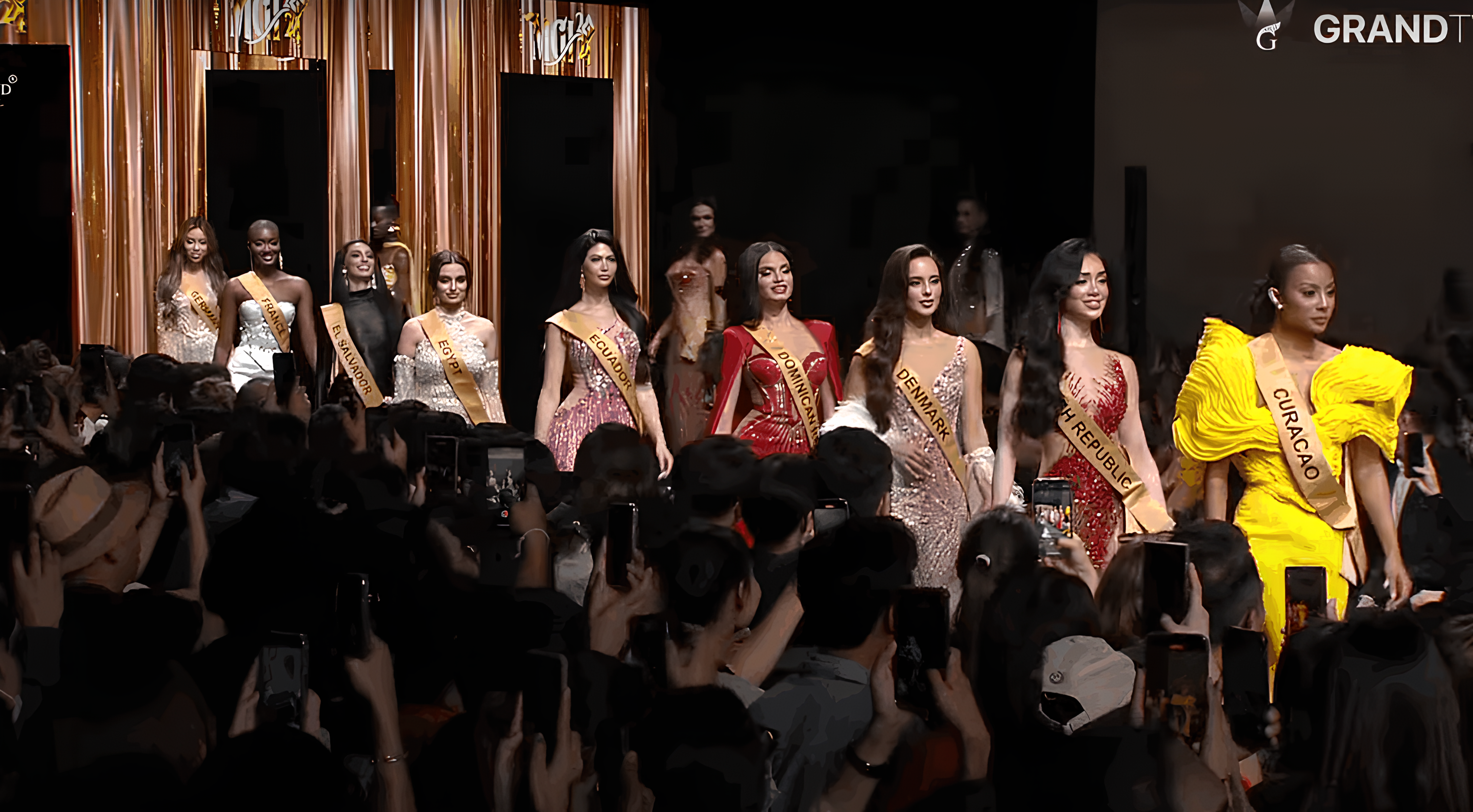
The pageant's press conference held on 10 October 2024 at the EmSphere, Bangkok.

Miss Grand International 2024 was the 12th Miss Grand International pageant, held at the MGI Hall in Bangkok, Thailand, on 25 October 2024.

At the conclusion of the event, Luciana Fuster of Peru crowned Rachel Gupta of India as Miss Grand International 2024. This is the first victory of India in the pageant's history. However, Gupta's reign ended on 28 May 2025 due to several issues between her and the organization, and the 1st runner-up, CJ Opiaza of the Philippines, took over the title.

Contestants from sixty-eight countries and territories competed in this edition. The competition was presented by Matthew Deane and was transmitted via the pageant's YouTube channel, GrandTV.

== Background ==
=== Location and date ===
In June 2022, the president of the contest, Nawat Itsaragrisil, president of the Miss Grand International Organization, revealed that the host country for the 2024 edition was in the process of negotiation.

Myanmar and Miss Grand International PCL reached a mutual agreement in July 2022. Early in 2023, the local organizer, Glamorous International, signed a memorandum of understanding with MGI PCL at the MGI Hall in Bangkok, Thailand. The agreement was officially announced on the finale of Miss Grand International 2023 on 25 October 2023. However, the organization later announced on 22 May 2024 that Myanmar will no longer serve as the host country for this edition due to a domestic political crisis, and that Cambodia and Thailand were elected as replacements.

Initially, the pageant was scheduled for Cambodia from 3 – 15 October 2024, including the best-in-swimsuit contest on 9 October, while the remaining pre-pageant events was set for Thailand. On 6 October, it was announced that all remaining pre-pageant events will move to Thailand. This decision comes after the Cambodian organizer failed to meet their contract and had conflicts with the Miss Grand International organization. The licence of Miss Grand Cambodia organizer, HK7 Co., Ltd., was removed by organization. On October 8, Nawat Itsaragrisil held a press conference with the Thai media regarding host country issues and announced that, in addition to Bangkok, the pageant's activities were scheduled in Pattaya from 11 – 16 October.

=== Selection of participants ===
Three delegates won their titles as a supplemental title in a multiple-award national pageant.Thirty-two delegates were appointed to their titles without competing in a 2024 national pageant.

==== Debuts, returns and withdrawals ====
In addition to the debut of Greenland, this edition has the returns of Cameroon and Côte d'Ivoire which last competed in 2014; New Zealand and Tanzania in 2018; Macau in 2019; Armenia in 2021; and Bangladesh, China, Curaçao and Pakistan in 2022.

Eight countries that competed at Miss Grand International 2023 did not select nor appoint a representative for this edition. Sabina Saharova of Latvia and Inês Perestrello of Portugal appointed a representative, but both of them did not compete for undisclosed reasons.

Five delegates withdrew during the pageant camp: Sotheary By of Cambodia, who withdrew from the competition due to the conflict between her director and the Miss Grand International organization, while Macarena Chamberlain of Costa Rica, Kaylie Cheung of Hong Kong and Kateryna Bilyk of Ukraine withdrew due to health issues. Madeleine Malmberg of Norway did not attend the final night for undisclosed reasons.

== Results ==
=== Placements ===
Placement	Contestant
Miss Grand International 2024	Philippines – CJ Opiaza
1st Runner-Up	Brazil – Talita Hartmann
2nd Runner-Up	United Kingdom – Amy Berry
3rd Runner-Up	Spain – Susana Medina
4th Runner-Up	Dominican Republic – María Felix
5th Runners-Up	Colombia – Angelica Valero; Curaçao – Akisha Albert; Indonesia – Nova Liana §; Malaysia – Melisha Lin; Peru – Arlette Rujel
Top 20	El Salvador – Giulia Zanoni; Guatemala – Tokyo Gonzalo; Japan – Naomi Shigemitsu; Mexico – Tania Estrada; Paraguay – Sharon Capó; Thailand – Malin Chara-anan ‡; United States Virgin Islands – Samantha Keaton

§ – Voted into the Top 10 by viewers and awarded as Miss Popular Vote
‡ – Voted into the Top 20 by viewers and awarded as Country's Power of the Year

==== Original Placements ====
Placement	Contestant
Miss Grand International 2024	India – Rachel Gupta (Dethroned)
1st Runner-Up	Philippines – CJ Opiaza
2nd Runner-Up	Myanmar – Thae Su Nyein (Dethroned)
3rd Runner-Up	France – Safiétou Kabengele (Resigned)
4th Runner-Up	Brazil – Talita Hartmann
5th Runners-Up	Dominican Republic – María Felix; Indonesia – Nova Liana §; Peru – Arlette Rujel; Spain – Susana Medina; United Kingdom – Amy Berry
Top 20	Colombia – Angelica Valero; Curaçao – Akisha Albert; El Salvador – Giulia Zanoni; Guatemala – Tokyo Gonzalo; Japan – Naomi Shigemitsu; Malaysia – Melisha Lin; Mexico – Tania Estrada; Paraguay – Sharon Capó; Thailand – Malin Chara-anan ‡; United States Virgin Islands – Samantha Keaton

=== Special awards ===
==== Major awards ====
Award	Contestant
Best in Evening Gown	Ghana – Sage-La'Parriea Yakubu
Best in Swimsuit	Brazil – Talita Hartmann
Best National Costume	Brazil – Talita Hartmann; Ecuador – María José Vera; Honduras – Yariela García
Country's Power of the Year	Thailand – Malin Chara-anan
Grand Voice Award	Trinidad and Tobago – Kristina James
Miss Popular Vote	Indonesia – Nova Liana

==== Sponsor awards ====
Award	Contestant
I'Aura Queen	Myanmar – Thae Su Nyein
Miss Beauty Skin	Myanmar – Thae Su Nyein; Thailand – Malin Chara-anan
Miss Charming	Indonesia – Nova Liana

Award	Recipient
Golden Grand Award	Miss Grand Japan – Eriko Yoshii
Silver Grand Awards	Miss Grand Brazil – Evandro Hazzy; Miss Grand Spain – Vicente Gonzalez

== Ancillary events ==
=== Fan vote ===
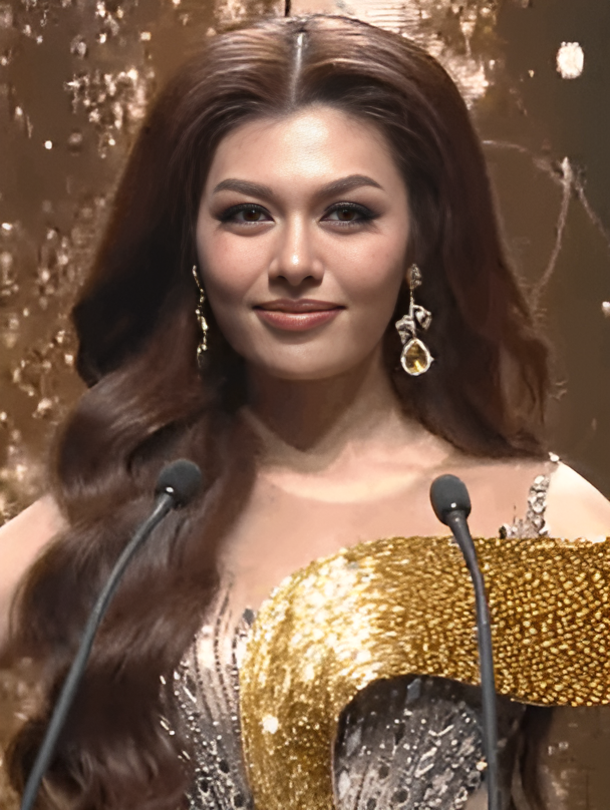
Nova Liana of Indonesia, who won the Miss Popular Vote award with 37% of the vote share.

On 30 September 2024, the pre-arrival voting challenge was launched on the pageant's official Facebook page and Instagram account where the portrait of each contestant was posted. The ten contestants with the most scores, calculated from the number of likes and shares on their portrait photos, acquired the right to attend the special dinner with the pageant president, Nawat Itsaragrisil, and the vice president, Teresa Chaivisut, on 4 October.

The second voting challenge is for the Country's Power of the Year award, in which the winner automatically qualifies for the top 20 finalists in the grand final round. It was launched from 20 – 25 October 2024 with sixty-nine contestants participating in the qualification round. Only sixteen with the highest points, calculated based on the number of likes and specific reactions to their portrait posted on the pageant's Instagram and Facebook page, qualify for the second round. The qualified candidates were divided into four groups. The same voting procedure was then used to determine the group winner to compete in the knockout round, where the top rank of each fixture progressed to the final round. Malin Chara-anan of Thailand was named the challenge winner, while Thae Su Nyein of Myanmar was the runner-up.

Another fan vote, Miss Popular Vote, in which the winner earns the automatic spot in the pageant's top 10 finalists, was open from 6 to 25 October via the pageant's official website. At the end of the voting period, Nova Liana of Indonesia, was announced as the winner.

The challenging results are shown below.

Pre-arrival voting winners	Country's Power of the Year	
Cambodia – Sotheary By (Note: Later withdrew.); India – Rachel Gupta; Indonesia – Nova Liana; Mexico – Tania Estrada; Myanmar – Thae Su Nyein; Paraguay – Sharon Capó; Philippines – Christine Opiaza; Spain – Susana Medina; Thailand – Malin Chara-anan; Vietnam – Quế Anh Võ	Winner	Thailand – Malin Chara-anan
Cambodia – Sotheary By; India – Rachel Gupta; Indonesia – Nova Liana; Mexico – Tania Estrada; Myanmar – Thae Su Nyein; Paraguay – Sharon Capó; Philippines – Christine Opiaza; Spain – Susana Medina; Thailand – Malin Chara-anan; Vietnam – Quế Anh Võ	Runner-Up	Myanmar – Thae Su Nyein
Cambodia – Sotheary By; India – Rachel Gupta; Indonesia – Nova Liana; Mexico – Tania Estrada; Myanmar – Thae Su Nyein; Paraguay – Sharon Capó; Philippines – Christine Opiaza; Spain – Susana Medina; Thailand – Malin Chara-anan; Vietnam – Quế Anh Võ	Top 4	India – Rachel Gupta; Peru – Arlette Rujel
Cambodia – Sotheary By; India – Rachel Gupta; Indonesia – Nova Liana; Mexico – Tania Estrada; Myanmar – Thae Su Nyein; Paraguay – Sharon Capó; Philippines – Christine Opiaza; Spain – Susana Medina; Thailand – Malin Chara-anan; Vietnam – Quế Anh Võ	Top 16	Angola – Nacira Amaral; Brazil – Talita Hartmann; Colombia – Angelica Valero; Guatemala – Tokyo Gonzalo; Indonesia – Nova Liana; Malaysia – Melisha Lin; Mexico – Tania Estrada; Paraguay – Sharon Capó; Philippines – CJ Opiaza; Spain – Susana Medina; Venezuela – Anna Blanco; Vietnam – Quế Anh Võ

=== Grand Voice award ===
The qualifying rounds of the singing challenge for the Grand Voice Award was held on 9 October at the Proud Fha Italian Restaurant in Bangkok. All 71 contestants participated in the event, and 30 qualified for the second round where the number of qualifiers was then reduced to 15. The third round of the challenge was held at the Golden Tulip Sovereign Hotel to determine the final 3. These three contestants competed against each other in the final round on the preliminary night on 22 October in Bangkok, and Kristina James of Trinidad and Tobago was announced the challenge winner at the grand final competition held on 25 October.

Position	Contestant
Winner	Trinidad and Tobago – Kristina James
Top 3	Netherlands – Ashley Brown; Venezuela – Anna Blanco
Top 15	Canada – Alivia Croal; France – Safiétou Kabengele; Greenland – Naja Rosing; Hong Kong – Kaylie Cheung; Kosovo – Engjellushe Zhuniqi; Malaysia – Melisha Lin; Nigeria – Roseline Orji; Norway – Madeleine Malmberg (Note: Did not attend final night.); Philippines – CJ Opiaza; United Kingdom – Amy Berry; United States – Cora Griffen; Vietnam – Quế Anh Võ
Top 30	Albania – Elsa Alijaj; Armenia – Haykanush Mkrtchyan; Bangladesh – Jessia Islam; Cuba – Lourdes Feliu; Dominican Republic – María Felix; El Salvador – Giulia Zanoni; India – Rachel Gupta; Indonesia – Nova Liana; Macau – Ohm Zhang; Myanmar – Thae Su Nyein; Nepal – Prema Lamgade; Peru – Arlette Rujel; Poland – Aleksandra Wielogórska; Spain – Susana Medina; Switzerland – Dalia Kramer

=== Best in Swimsuit ===
The best-in-swimsuit round was scheduled for 13 October 2024 on the OceanSky Cruise in Pattaya Bay. Seventy contestants participated; Kaylie Cheung of Hong Kong was absent due to health issues. Only twenty contestants, 10 elected via the public vote and the others 10 by the panel of judges, were nominated for the award. Three winners of this sub-contest were later announced in the grand final round on 25 October 2024 in Bangkok.

The panel of judges for this section, including Nawat Itsaragrisil – the pageant's president, Teresa Chaivisut – the pageant's vice president, and Luciana Fuster – Miss Grand International 2023.

Position		Contestant
Winner		Brazil – Talita Hartmann
Top 20	Judges	Côte d'Ivoire – Aya Kadjo; Curacao – Akisha Albert; Dominican Republic – María Felix; El Salvador – Giulia Zanoni; France – Safiétou Kabengele; India – Rachel Gupta; Malaysia – Melisha Lin; Spain – Susana Medina; United States Virgin Islands – Samantha Keaton
Top 20	Vote	Colombia – Angelica Valero; Guatemala – Tokyo Gonzalo; Indonesia – Nova Liana; Mexico – Tania Estrada; Myanmar – Thae Su Nyein; Paraguay – Sharon Capó; Peru – Arlette Rujel; Philippines – CJ Opiaza; Thailand – Malin Chara-anan; Vietnam – Quế Anh Võ

=== National Costume contest ===
The competition for the Best in National Costume Award took place on 20 October 2024 at the MGI Hall, Bravo BKK Mall, Bangkok, with 69 contestants participating. Only 22 costumes; 10 via public vote, and the other 12 selected by the judges, qualify for the second scoring round, in which the number was reduced to 10 costumes; 5 selected by vote and the remaining half to be picked by the judges.

The event, which was hosted by Miss Grand International 2023 – Luciana Fuster and an MGI's MC – Sakul Limpapanon, was transmitted to audiences worldwide via the pageant's YouTube channel and Facebook page.

Position		Contestant
Winners		Brazil – Talita Hartmann; Ecuador – María José Vera; Honduras – Yariela García
Top 10	Judges	Malaysia – Melisha Lin; United Kingdom – Amy Berry
Top 10	Vote	Guatemala – Cristina Gonzalo; Indonesia – Nova Liana; Myanmar – Thae Su Nyein; Thailand – Malin Chara-anan; Vietnam – Quế Anh Võ
Top 22	Judges	Czech Republic – Veronica Biasiol; Japan – Naomi Shigemitsu; New Zealand – Alyssa Roberts; Nigeria – Roseline Orji; Panama – Yanelys Bergantiño; Puerto Rico – Mariangie Alicea; South Korea – Yu-hyun Chang; Spain – Susana Medina
Top 22	Vote	Haiti – Shaika Cadet; Mexico – Tania Estrada; Peru – Arlette Rujel; Philippines – CJ Opiaza

== Main pageant ==
=== Format ===
As done since 2013, twenty semi-finalists will be selected to continue in the competition. All accumulated scores, together with the preliminary round held on 22 October, which consisted of the swimsuit and the evening gown round, determined the 19 semifinalists. The winner of the Country of the Year award, determined through public voting, completed the twenty semi-finalists, who then paraded in the swimsuit competition. Afterward, the final 10 were named: 9 from the custom selection and another one was the Miss Popular Vote winner. These 10 finalists competed in the evening gown and speech segments to determine the top 5 candidates who later entered the question-and-answer round. Based on all accumulated scores, the runners-up and winner were named at the end of the event.

== Contestants ==
68 contestants competed for the title:

Country/Territory	Contestant	Age (Note: Ages at the time of the pageant)	Hometown
Albania	Elsa Alijaj	23	Laç
Angola	Nacira Amaral	20	Dombe Grande
Argentina	Alejandra Morales	27	Córdoba
Armenia	Haykanush Mkrtchyan	23	Yerevan
Australia	Paitin Powell	26	Whitsundays
Bangladesh	Jessia Islam	25	Dhaka
Belgium	Jennifer Louise	22	Heuvelland
Bolivia	Carolina Granier	26	La Paz
Brazil	Talita Hartmann	27	São Vicente do Sul
Cameroon	Sharlynn Acha	21	Tiko
Canada	Alivia Croal	23	Selwyn
Chile	Gabriella Álvez	27	Temuco
China	Zhongyi Sun	24	Guilin
Colombia	Angelica Valero	30	Cúcuta
Côte d'Ivoire	Aya Kadjo	28	Yamoussoukro
Cuba	Lourdes Feliu	23	La Lisa
Curaçao	Akisha Albert	29	Willemstad
Czech Republic	Veronica Biasiol	26	Prague
Denmark	Cecilia Presmann	23	Bangkok
Dominican Republic	María Felix	24	Santo Domingo
Ecuador	María José Vera	26	Valencia
Egypt	Zeina Emara	29	Cairo
El Salvador	Giulia Zanoni	19	San Salvador
France	Safiétou Kabengele	26	Le Val-d'Hazey
Germany	Phi-Nhung Ilynn Sasolith	26	Cologne
Ghana	Sage-La'Parriea Yakubu	24	Accra
Gibraltar	Faith Torres	23	Gibraltar
Greenland	Naja Rosing	26	Nuuk
Guatemala	Tokyo Gonzalo	21	Antigua Guatemala
Haiti	Shaika Cadet	24	Port-au-Prince
Honduras	Yariela García	27	Tegucigalpa
India	Rachel Gupta	20	Jalandhar
Indonesia	Nova Liana	23	Empat Lawang
Italy	Micaela Vietto	29	Farigliano
Japan	Naomi Shigemitsu	21	Aichi
Kosovo	Engjellushe Zhuniqi	26	Priština
Laos	Souksavanh Vongsomphou	28	Paksong
Macau	Ohm Zhang	24	Santo António
Malaysia	Melisha Lin	26	Batu Caves
Mexico	Tania Estrada	28	Vicente Guerrero
Myanmar	Thae Su Nyein	18	Yangon
Nepal	Prema Lamgade	24	Bhairahawa
Netherlands	Ashley Brown	20	Amsterdam
New Zealand	Alyssa Roberts	21	Auckland
Nicaragua	Isabella Salgado	27	Chinandega
Nigeria	Roseline Orji	23	Lagos
Pakistan	Roma Michael	29	Lahore
Panama	Yanelys Bergantiño	22	Guararé
Paraguay	Sharon Capó	24	Pedro Juan Caballero
Peru	Arlette Rujel	25	Callao
Philippines	CJ Opiaza	26	Castillejos
Poland	Aleksandra Wielogórska	20	Warsaw
Puerto Rico	Mariangie Alicea	26	Juana Diaz
Russia	Renata Nadrshina	23	Ufa
Singapore	Anisah Rahmat	23	Singapore
South Africa	Sharné Dheochand	21	Newcastle
South Korea	Yu-hyun Chang	27	Seoul
Spain	Susana Medina	25	Telde
Switzerland	Dalia Kramer	28	Zürich
Taiwan	Yuhan Chen	25	Taiwan
Tanzania	Fatma Suleiman	23	Kinondoni
Thailand	Malin Chara-anan	28	Bangkok
Trinidad and Tobago	Kristina James	25	El Dorado
United Kingdom	Amy Berry	26	Grimsby
United States	Cora Griffen	28	Columbus
United States Virgin Islands	Samantha Keaton	23	San Antonio
Venezuela	Anna Blanco	24	Caracas
Vietnam	Quế Anh Võ	23	Quảng Nam
