= Miss Grand Curaçao =

Curaçaoan beauty pageant

- Formation: 2014
- Headquarters: Willemstad
- Location: Curaçao
- Official language: English; Dutch
- National director: Ayshel Maria
- Parent organization: Curaçao BP Committee
- Affiliations: Miss Grand International

Miss Grand Curaçao is a Curaçaoan beauty contest that chooses a representative for the Miss Grand International pageant. Silvienne Winklaar, the winner of the Miss Grand Curaçao 2014 pageant, was the first Curaçaoan to compete at Miss Grand International. Since 2019, the right to send Curaçaoan representatives to compete at Miss Grand International belonged to the Miss Curaçao organizer, Curaçao Beauty Pageant Committee, which was led by Ayshel Maria.

Only one contest has been held; other titleholders were appointed by their respective licensees. The highest placement so far is the fifth runner-up, obtained by Akisha Albert in 2024. The other representative was also placed in the top 20, obtained by Kanisha Sluis in 2022.

== History ==
In partnership with Señorita Curaçao and food delivery company Curadise, HUGON Business Management & Entrepreneurial organized the first contest of the Miss Grand Curaçao pageant in 2014 in Willemstad. The event was held at the World Trade Center Curaçao on 30 April with seven national finalists, with nineteen-year-old, Silvienne Winklaar, the winner. Winklaar then represented the country at the Miss Grand International 2014 in Thailand, making her the first Curaçaoan candidate at the contest, but was unplaced. There was an attempt to organize the pageant in 2015, but it was canceled for undisclosed reasons.

In 2019, Curaçao returned to the competition as the Curaçao Beauty Pageant Committee (CBPC), chaired by Ayshel Maria, purchased the license. All Miss Grand Curaçao titleholders were handpicked by the committee, with most of them finalists of the CBPC-affiliated pageant, Miss Curaçao.

== Edition ==
The Miss Grand Curaçao pageant was held once in 2014 by the Señorita Curaçao organization, the Curadise company, and the HUGON Curaçao.

| Year | Edition | Date | Final venue | Entrants | Winner | Ref. |
|---|---|---|---|---|---|---|
| 2014 | 1st | 30 April | World Trade Center Curaçao, Willemstad | 8 | Silvienne Winklaar | |

== International competition ==
The following is a list of Curaçaoan representatives at the Miss Grand International contest.

Color keys

- : Declared the winner
- : Finished as a runner-up (Top 5)
- : Finished as a finalist (Top 10)
- : Finished as a semifinalist (Top 20/21)
- : Finished as special awards winner

| Year | Miss Grand Curaçao | Title | Placement | Special Awards | National Director |
|---|---|---|---|---|---|
| 2025 | Did not compete | | | | |
| 2024 | Akisha Albert | Miss Curaçao 2018 | 5th runner-up | | Aysjel Maria |
| 2023 | Did not compete | | | | |
| 2022 | Kanisha Sluis | Miss Curaçao 2015 | Top 20 | | Aysjel Maria |
| 2021 | Kimberly Fernandes | Appointed | Unplaced | | Aysjel Maria |
| 2020 | Did not compete | | | | |
| 2019 | Liane Bonofacia | Finalist Miss Curaçao 2019 | Unplaced | | Aysjel Maria |
Did not compete between 2015-2018
| 2014 | Silvienne Winklaar | Miss Grand Curaçao 2014 | Unplaced | | Dushi Magazine |

== Winners gallery ==
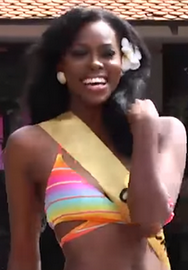
2014, Silvienne Winklaar

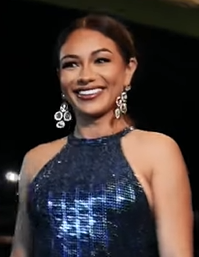
2021, Kimberly Fernandes

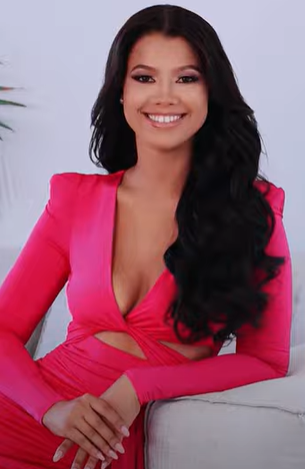
2022, Kanisha Sluis

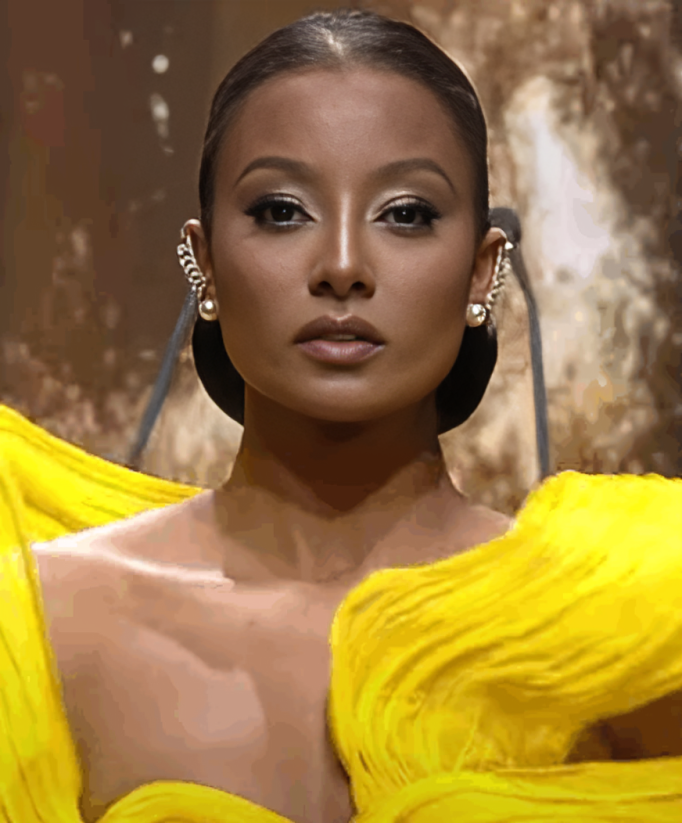
2024, Akisha Albert
