= Safiétou Kabengele =

French-Senegalese beauty queen and export coordinator

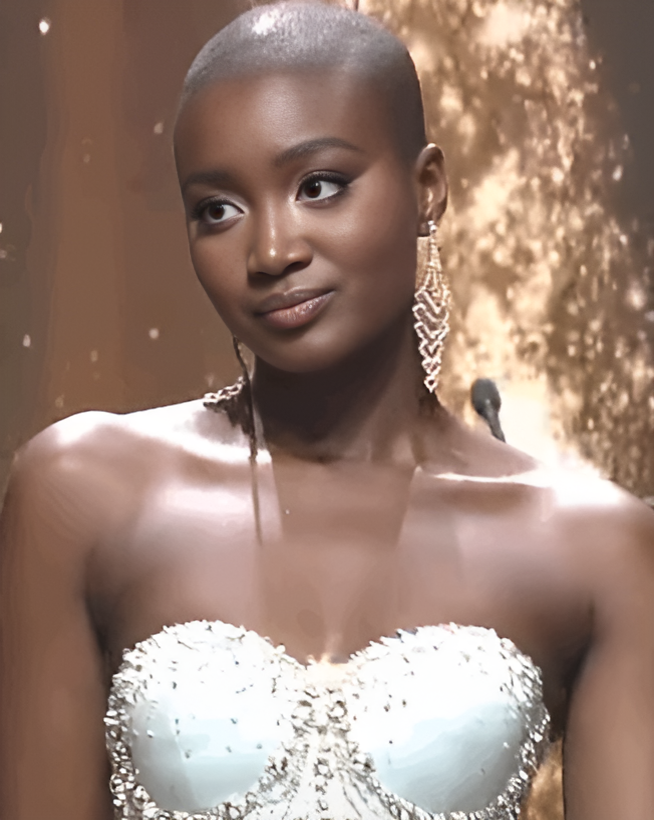
- Safiétou Kabengele in 2024
- Born: Dakar, Senegal
- Occupations: Export coordinator, model
- Beauty pageant titleholder
- Title: Miss Grand France 2024
- Years active: 2021–present
- Hair color: Bald
- Eye color: Dark brown
- Major competitions: Miss Grand France 2024; (Winner); Miss Grand International 2024; (3rd Runner-up; Resigned)

Safiétou Kabengele is a French-Senegalese model, export coordinator, and beauty queen who was crowned Miss Grand France 2024. She represented France at the Miss Grand International 2024 pageant in Bangkok, Thailand, where she placed as third runner-up. She later resigned the title.

== Early life and career ==
Kabengele was born in Dakar, Senegal, and raised in Normandy, France, from infancy. She has Senegalese and Congolese heritage.

From a young age, she was passionate about various forms of expression, including fashion, dance, and public speaking. Initially lacking self-confidence, it was her family and loved ones who recognized her potential and encouraged her to pursue pageantry. Prior to her involvement in pageantry, she worked as an export coordinator in the pharmaceutical industry.

== Pageantry ==
=== Early pageant experience ===
Kabengele's pageant journey began with the Miss Normandie competition for Miss France, where she placed as second runner-up in 2021 and first runner-up in 2022. After two attempts, she decided to compete in Miss Grand France, marking her third major pageant endeavor.

=== Miss Grand France 2024 ===
On 8 May 2024, Kabengele represented Normandy at the Miss Grand France 2024 pageant held at the Théâtre de Longjumeau in Paris. She emerged victorious among 17 contestants, earning the title of Miss Grand France 2024.

=== Miss Grand International 2024 ===
Following her national win, Kabengele represented France at the Miss Grand International 2024 pageant in Bangkok, Thailand. She achieved the position of third runner-up.

During the swimsuit round of the semi final of the competition, she stood out by removing a wig and daringly showing her bald head.

Following the competition, Kabengele spoke out about an incident between her and the reigning queen at the time, Rachel Gupta of India.

On 5 June 2025, Kabengele resigned from her title as the third runner up after citing personal attacks and lack of defense or clarification regarding her title from the organisation.

== Personal life ==
Outside of her modeling and pageant career, Kabengele continues to work as an export coordinator. She is known for her advocacy on issues related to diversity and inclusion, using her platform to inspire and empower others. Kabengele emphasizes the importance of versatility and believes that a woman can excel in multiple fields without limiting herself to a single path.

Awards and achievements
Preceded by (United States) Sthephanie Miranda	3rd Runner-up Miss Grand International (Resigned); 2024	Succeeded by (Spain) Susana Medina (Assumed)
