= Miss Grand France 2023 =

5th Miss Grand France competition, beauty pageant edition

- Date: 13 August 2023
- Presenters: Matthieu Moille
- Venue: La Salicorne Restaurant, Saujon
- Entrants: 9
- Placements: 5
- Debuts: Alsace; Bordeaux; Médoc; Poitou-Charentes
- Withdrawals: Aquitaine; Auvergne; French Polynesia; Grand Est; Nouvelle-Aquitaine; Paris; Rhône-Alpes
- Returns: Brittany; Île-de-France; Occitanie; Pays de la Loire
- Winner: Clémence Drouhaud (Poitou-Charentes)

External videos
- Miss Grand France 2023 Finals
- 2023 Miss Grand France Finals by Celest Productions

Miss Grand France 2023 competition result by region/city
Colors key
Winner	3rd runner-up
1st runner-up	4th runner-up
2nd runner-up	Unplaced
No representative

Miss Grand France 2023 was the 5th edition of the Miss Grand France pageant, held at the La Salicorne Restaurant, Saujon, on 13 August 2023. Nine contestants, who were elected by different regional organizers, competed for the title. Of whom, a 19-year-old model representing Poitou-Charentes, Clémence Drouhaud, was announced the winner, while Aya Kadjo of Alsace was named the first vice-miss.

Drouhaud later represented France at the international parent stage, Miss Grand International 2023 in Vietnam, and was placed among the top 20 finalists, making her the third France representative to obtain the placement at Miss Grand International, following Eline Lamboley in 2015 and Elodie Sirulnick in 2021.

This year's edition was also considered the first Miss Grand France organized by Celesta Productions with Philippe Blockelet and Robles Yanez as co-directors.

== Result ==
Placement	Candidate
Miss Grand France 2023	Poitou-Charentes – Clémence Drouhaud
1st runner-up	Alsace – Aya Kadjo
2nd runner-up	Bordeaux – Océanne Facorat
3rd runner-up	Occitania – Fanny Julien Salva
4th runner-up	Brittany – Ophélie Nicol
Special award
Miss Popular	Alsace – Aya Kadjo

== Candidates ==
Nine contestants competed for the title.

- Alsace – Aya Kadjo
- Bordeaux – Océanne Facorat
- Brittany – Ophélie Nicol
- Gironde – Marion Dormignie (withdrew)
- Île-de-France – Morgane Chrétien
- Médoc – Héloïse Mahieu
- Occitania – Fanny Julien Salva
- Paris – Tiffany Dupas (withdrew)
- Pays de la Loire – Malaury Turpin
- Poitou-Charentes – Clemence Drouhuad
- Provence-Alpes-Côte d'Azur – Oceane Ramella
