= Miss Grand Mauritius =

Beauty pageant in Mauritius

- Formation: 2014
- Type: Beauty pageant
- Headquarters: Port Louis
- Location: Mauritius
- Members: Miss Grand International
- Official language: French; English

Miss Grand Mauritius licensee timeline

Miss Grand Mauritius is a national beauty pageant title awarded to Mauritian representatives competing at the Miss Grand International contest. The title was first awarded in 2014 to an interior designer and model, Dolesswaree Charun, and that year's licensee was Raj Ramrachia of the Miss India Mauritius pageant. However, Charun failed to qualify for the semifinal round on the international stage held in Thailand on October 7, 2014.

The license of Miss Grand Mauritius was transferred to the Miss Supranational Mauritius organizer, Miss Earth Mauritius pageant, and Ahmad-Abbas Ltd. in 2015, 2016, and 2019, respectively. Still, most of the country representatives were appointed; no Miss Grand National was held, the country representative was directly elected through the contest only in 2021 when the pageant named Ahmad-Abbas Pageant Show was organized to select the Mauritian candidate for Miss Grand International specifically.

Since the first competition in 2014, the highest and only placement of Mauritian representatives in the Miss Grand International contest was the final 10, obtained in 2022 by an appointed Yuvna Rinishta after she won the Miss Popular Vote and automatically qualified for the mentioned position. On the occasion of celebrating the pageant's first decade anniversary, Yuvna was also assumed to be the 5th runner-up, but was forced to resign three days later due to her inability to sign a contract with the international body as well as the conflict between the Mauritian national director and the international organizer.

== History ==
Mauritius debuted in Miss Grand International in 2014 and was represented by Dolesswaree Charun, who was previously placed as one of the top 10 finalists at the Miss India Mauritius 2014 pageant and was subsequently assigned by the national organizer to represent the country at the Miss Grand International 2014 pageant in Thailand. A year later, the license was transferred to Ameeksha Dilchand, the director of Miss Supranational Mauritius; however, due to her inability to send a Mauritian candidate to compete internationally, the license was handed over to Miss Earth Mauritius organizer William Madarassou, the following year. No Mauritian candidates at Miss Grand International in 2017 and 2018 due to no licensees.

After two consecutive years of absence, the Miss Grand Mauritius franchise was granted by Ahmad Abbas Mamode's model agency company, Ahmad-Abbas Ltd., which served as the licensee body from 2019 to 2022. During such a period, most of the country representatives at Miss Grand International were directly hand-picked by the national director, except for 2021, when the newly established contest of the Ahmad-Abbas Pageant Show was organized and the main winner was sent to compete in Miss Grand International 2021 in Thailand, while the vice-misses were sent to other international platforms, such as Miss Eco International and Miss Planet International. The partnership between Ahmad-Abbas Ltd. and Miss Grand International PLC was discontinued in late 2022 as a result of the conflict after the 2022 International coronation night in Indonesia.

== International competition ==
The following is a list of Mauritian representatives at the Miss Grand International contest.

Year	Representative	Original national title	Competition performance		National director
Year	Representative	Original national title	Placement	Other awards	National director
2014	Dolesswaree Charun	Top 10 Miss India Mauritius 2014	Unplaced	—N/a	Raj Ramrachia
2015	Stacy Ng See Cheong	Miss Supranational Mauritius 2014	Did not compete		Ameeksha Dilchand
2016	Sehba Ramjaun	Miss Earth Air Mauritius 2016	Unplaced	—N/a	William Madarassou
2019	Shanone Savatheama	Finalist Elite Model Look Mauritius 2014	Unplaced	—N/a	Ahmad Abbas Mamode
2020	Tania René	Appointed	Unplaced	—N/a	Ahmad Abbas Mamode
2021	Naomi Buan	Miss Grand Mauritius 2021	Unplaced	—N/a	Ahmad Abbas Mamode
2022	Yuvna Rinishta Gookool	Appointed	5th runner-up	Miss Popular Vote	Ahmad Abbas Mamode
No representatives since 2023

== Titleholders gallery ==
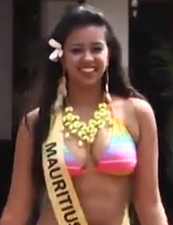
Miss Grand Mauritius 2014
Dolesswaree Charun

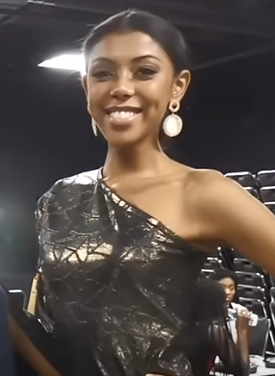
Miss Grand Mauritius 2021
Naomi Buan

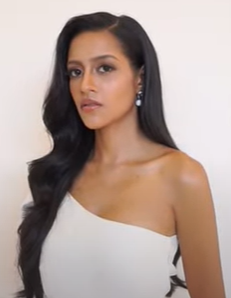
Miss Grand Mauritius 2022
Yuvna Rinishta

== Controversy ==
=== 2022 Delegitimisation ===
On October 28, 2022, three days after the Miss Grand International 2022 coronation night, the pageant organizer released an official statement on their Facebook page dethroning Miss Grand Mauritius, Yuvna Rinishta, who had previously won the Miss Popular Vote then was automatically placed among the top 10 finalists (also assumed the 5th runners-up) and was also required to sign a contract to work with the organization until January 2023. According to the aforementioned announcement, Miss Mauritius decided to resign from the title due to her inability to sign the contract and complete the duty as the 5th runner-up, therefore she could no longer use the title with immediate effect.

However, the Miss Grand Mauritius organizer, Ahmad Abbas, thereupon publicized an argument on the national pageant's social media claiming that the content previously published by the Miss Grand International organization caused a misunderstanding, despite the fact that Miss Yuvna had already received a resignation document but did not sign it and disagreed with the content mentioned in the document. The reason given for the incident is that the vision of the international organization does not correspond to that of the Miss Grand Mauritius pageant. Abbas also requested the international organizer stop publishing such a misleading statement.

According to the Miss Grand International chairperson's statement, published by Thai online newspapers, cited that the Mauritian national director, who stay with Miss Yuvna in Thailand and Indonesia for three months of training prior to entering the international contest, requested to closely follow Miss Yuvna during the 5th runner-up's duty period, but the international firm refused. A problem-solving negotiation occurred, but no mutual agreements were achieved. The national director also refused to allow Miss Yuvna to sign the contract and asked that she return to the country, causing the international organizer to demand she resign, and later assigned the Philippines representative, Roberta Tamondong, as the replacement.
