= Miss Grand Curaçao 2014 =

1st Miss Grand Curaçao competition, beauty pageant edition

- Date: 30 April 2014
- Venue: World Trade Center Curaçao, Willemstad
- Entrants: 8
- Placements: 3
- Winner: Silvienne Winklaar (Willemstad)

Miss Grand Curaçao 2014 was the inaugural edition of the Miss Grand Curaçao pageant, held on 30 April 2014, at the World Trade Center Curaçao (WTC) in the capital city, Willemstad. Eight candidates, who qualified for the pageant via an audition held on 15 April at the Molenplein School, competed for the title, and a nineteen-year-old tourism management student from the capital city, Silvienne Winklaar, was announced the winner.

Winklaar then represented the country at the second edition of the Miss Grand International pageant held later that year in Thailand, where she was placed among the top 20 finalists of the Best National Costume contest. However, Winklaar failed to qualify for the top 20 finalists in the grand final round held on 4 October.

The event was organized by the Señorita Curaçao organization, with financial support from a food delivery company, Curadise, and a business management and entrepreneurial private firm, HUGON Curaçao.

== Contestants ==
The national finalists include;

Contestant	Age	Height
Chimay Damainy Ramos^{[α]}	19	1.72 m (5 ft 7 1/2 in)
Staphany Fanny Winklaar	22	1.60 m (5 ft 3 in)
Silvienne Winklaar	19	1.72 m (5 ft 7 1/2 in)
Angelica Lazamaria Curiel	17	1.60 m (5 ft 3 in)
Brittany Farysha Cecillia	17	1.62 m (5 ft 4 in)
Ailine Mingeli	18	1.60 m (5 ft 3 in)
Ansjeline Eduarda Sebastiana	18	1.60 m (5 ft 3 in)
Kimberly Prisca Regales	18	1.70 m (5 ft 7 in)
Note: ^α Later Miss Grand Aruba 2016.
