= Miss Grand France =

Beauty pageant in France

- Formation: 4 July 2019; 7 years ago
- Founder: Sonia Aït Mansour
- Type: Beauty pageant
- Headquarters: Caen
- Location: France
- Members: Miss Grand International
- Official language: French
- National director: Léna Abgrall (2026 – present)
- Website: MissGrandFrance.com

Miss Grand France is a French female national beauty pageant, held annually since 2019. The contest's winners represent the country at its international parent platform, Miss Grand International. Before 2019, all country representatives in such an international contest were appointed; most of them were the Miss Prestige National finalists (currently, Miss Excellence France).

The highest achievement reached by French representatives at the Miss Grand International pageant is the 3rd runner-up position, obtained by Safiétou Kabengele in 2024.

== History ==
France has participated in nearly every edition of the Miss Grand International pageant, with the exception of 2018. During the pageant's early years, French representatives were appointed by various national directors to compete. Following the country's absence in 2018, former Miss Grand France titleholder Sonia Mansour acquired the national franchise in 2019 and organized the first Miss Grand France pageant on 4 July of that year. Cassandra De Sousa was crowned winner among nine national finalists. De Sousa went on to compete at Miss Grand International 2019 in Venezuela that October but did not place.

In 2021, Mansour lost the franchise to another organization, which continued running the Miss Grand France pageant. Due to health restrictions related to the COVID-19 pandemic, that year's edition was held privately with only five national finalists competing. Elodie Sirulnick, a 24-year-old model from Aquitaine, was crowned the winner, and also received the Elegance and Sympathy special awards. The organization subsequently lost the license to Venezuelan-born Robles Yanez of Celest Productions in 2023. In 2026, the license passed to Léna Abgrall, a former beauty queen based in Caen.

== Editions ==
=== Date and venue ===
The following are the edition details of the Miss Grand France pageant, since its establishment in 2019.

Miss Grand France Editions
Year	Edition	Date	Venue	Entrants	Ref.
2019	1st	4 July	La Villa Maasai, Paris	9	
2020	2nd	5 July	La Villa Maasai, Paris	13	
2021	3rd	11 July	Normandy Le Chantier Hotel, Paris	5	
2022	4th	3 September	Le Mughal Restaurant, Paris	10	
2023	5th	13 August	La Salicorne Restaurant, Saujon	9	
2024	6th	8 May	Theater of Longjumeau, Longjumeau	17	

=== Competition result ===
Miss Grand France Competition Results
Edition	Miss Grand France	Vice queens				Ref.
Edition	Miss Grand France	2nd place	3rd place	4th place	5th place	Ref.
2019	Cassandra De Sousa (Centre-Val de Loire)	Alice Delaroche (Note: As Miss Face of Beauty France 2019) (Grand Est)	Magalie Kabengele (Hauts-de-France)	Laetitia Boyer (Réunion)	Not Awarded	
2020	Marine Comby (Nouvelle-Aquitaine)	Julie Goursaud (Note: As Miss Face of Beauty France 2020) (Île-de-France)	Orianne Beuze (French Guiana)	Cutiesha Miranda Sua (Hauts-de-France)	Not Awarded	
2021	Elodie Sirulnick (Île-de-France)	Erika Fischer (Bourgogne-Franche-Comté)	Tyna Leclerc (Grand Est)	Claire Lamon (Normandy)	Alizée Jego (Brittany)	
2022	Lucie Carbone (Provence-Alpes-Côte d'Azur)	Kamilla Yahiaoui (Rhône-Alpes)	Léna Vairac (Grand Est)	Marion Dormignie (Nouvelle-Aquitaine)	Marine Ihuel (Aquitaine)	
2023	Clémence Drouhaud (Poitou-Charentes)	Aya Kadjo (Alsace)	Océanne Facorat (Bordeaux)	Fanny Julien Salva (Occitania)	Ophélie Nicol (Brittany)	
2024	Safiétou Kabengele (Normandy)	Clémentine Albié (Aquitaine)	Maeva Chambeau (Martinique)	Anais Legrand (Paris)	Sarah Mandjou (Brittany)	

== International competition ==
The following is a list of French representatives at the Miss Grand International contest.

Color keys

- : Declared as the winner
- : Ended as a runner-up (Top 5)
- : Ended as a finalist (Top 10)
- : Ended as a semifinalist (Top 20/21)
- : Ended as special awards winner

Year	Region	Miss Grand France	National qualification	Placement	Special awards	National director
2027			Miss Grand France 2027			Léna Abgrall
2026	Normandy	Axelle Varin	Appointment	Unplaced		Léna Abgrall
2025	Île-de-France	Elisa Mysyshyne	Appointment	Top 22		Robles Yanez
2024	Normandy	Safiétou Kabengele	Miss Grand France 2024	3rd runner-up		Robles Yanez
2023	Nouvelle-Aquitaine	Clémence Drouhaud	Miss Grand France 2023	Top 20		Robles Yanez
2022	Provence-Alpes-Côte d'Azur	Lucie Carbone	Miss Grand France 2022	Unplaced		Unknown
2021	Île-de-France	Elodie Sirulnick	Miss Grand France 2021	Top 20		Unknown
2020	Nouvelle-Aquitaine	Marine Comby	Miss Grand France 2020	Unplaced		Sonia Mansour
2019	Centre-Val de Loire	Cassandra De Sousa	Miss Grand France 2019	Unplaced		Sonia Mansour
2018	No representative					
2017	Île-de-France	Sonia Aït Mansour	Miss Prestige Paris-Ile de France 2016	Unplaced		Réjane Klein Maurer
2016	Grand Est	Océane Pernodet	Miss Prestige Lorraine 2014	Unplaced		Réjane Klein Maurer
2015	Île-de-France	Eline Lamboley	Miss Rose 2014	Top 20		Réjane Klein Maurer
2014	Occitania	Norma Julia	Miss Nationale 2014	Unplaced		Réjane Klein Maurer
2013	Île-de-France	Margaux Semenoff	Appointment	Unplaced		Réjane Klein Maurer

== Gallery ==
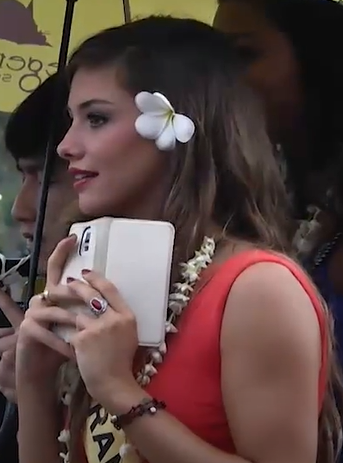
Miss Grand France 2014
Norma Julia

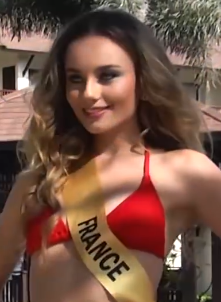
Miss Grand France 2015
Eline Lamboley

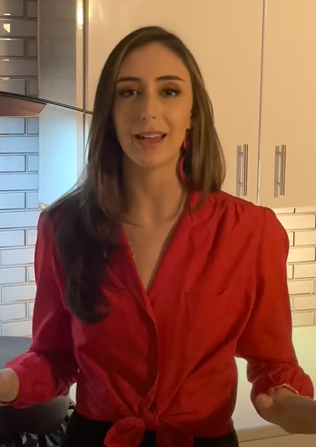
Miss Grand France 2021
Elodie Sirulnick

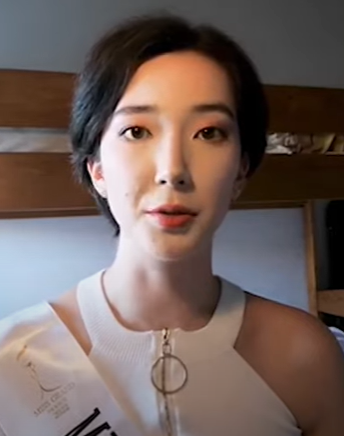
Miss Grand France 2022
Lucie Carbone

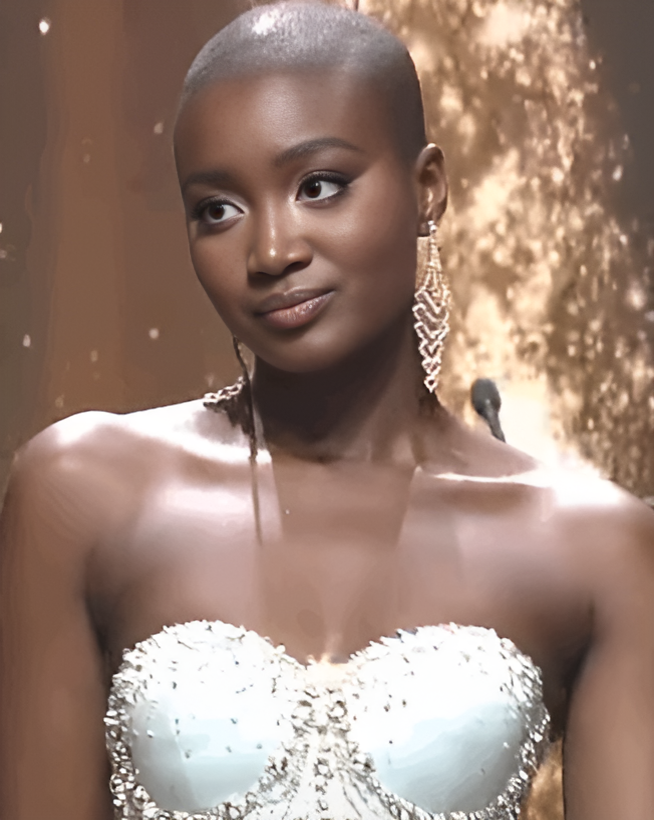
Miss Grand France 2024
Safiétou Kabengele

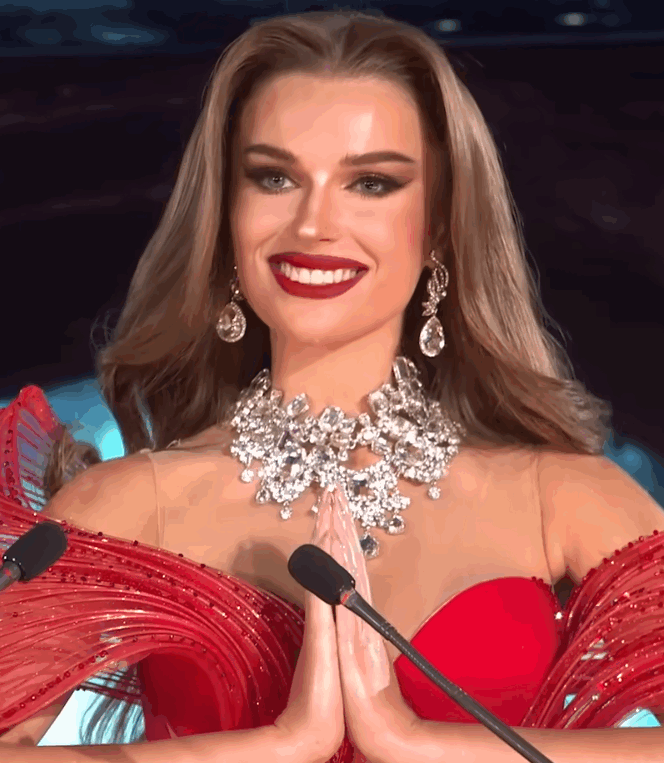
Miss Grand France 2025
Elisa Mysyshyne

== National finalists ==
The following list is the candidates of Miss Grand France in each year's edition.

Color keys
W Declared as the winner
Ended as a runner-up
Ended as a semifinalist
Ended as a quarterfinalist
Ṉ Withdrew
– Did not participate

Represented	2019	2020	2021	2022	2023	2024
Alsace	—N/a	—N/a	—N/a	—N/a	Aya Kadjo (1st)	—N/a
Antilles	—N/a	—N/a	—N/a	—N/a	—N/a	Léna Vairac
Aquitaine	—N/a	—N/a	—N/a	Marine Ihuel (4th)	—N/a	Clémentine Albié (1st)
Auvergne	—N/a	—N/a	—N/a	Laure-Emmanuelle Marion	—N/a	Cleo Antignat
Auvergne-Rhône-Alpes	Noemie Ekoué	Ines Buchaillat	—N/a	—N/a	—N/a	—N/a
Bordeaux	—N/a	—N/a	—N/a	—N/a	Océanne Facorat (2nd)	—N/a
Bourgogne-Franche-Comté	—N/a	Clara David	Erika Fischer (1st)	—N/a	—N/a	—N/a
Brittany (Bretagne)	—N/a	Juliette Tang	Alizée Jego (4th)	—N/a	Ophélie Nicol (4th)	Sarah Mandjou (4th)
Centre-Val de Loire	Cassandra De Sousa (W)	Anaïs Arnal	—N/a	—N/a	—N/a	—N/a
Champagne-Ardenne	—N/a	—N/a	—N/a	—N/a	—N/a	Anne Djoba
Communaute Etrangere	—N/a	—N/a	—N/a	—N/a	—N/a	Judith Bonang
Corsica	—N/a	—N/a	—N/a	—N/a	—N/a	—N/a
French Guiana (Guyane)	Orianne Beuze	Orianne Beuze (1st)	—N/a	—N/a	—N/a	—N/a
French Polynesia (Tahiti)	—N/a	—N/a	—N/a	Alicia Hoatua-Chave	—N/a	—N/a
Grand Est	Alice Delaroche^{[α]} (W)	Ornella J.	Tyna Leclerc (2nd)	Léna Vairac (2nd)	—N/a	—N/a
Guadeloupe	—N/a	—N/a	—N/a	—N/a	—N/a	Alexandra Gradel
Hauts-de-France	Magalie Kabengele (1st)	Cutiesha Miranda Sua (2nd)	—N/a	—N/a	—N/a	—N/a
Île-de-France	Juliette Fage	Julie Goursaud ^{[α]} (W)	—N/a	Nancy Leong	Morgane Chrétien	Pauline Thimon
Languedoc	—N/a	—N/a	—N/a	—N/a	—N/a	Manuella Gritar
Loire-Atlantique	—N/a	—N/a	—N/a	—N/a	—N/a	Anna Jalia
Maine-et-Loire	—N/a	—N/a	—N/a	—N/a	—N/a	Elma Guilleux
Martinique	—N/a	—N/a	—N/a	—N/a	—N/a	Maeva Chambeau (2nd)
Mayotte	—N/a	—N/a	—N/a	—N/a	—N/a	—N/a
Médoc	—N/a	—N/a	—N/a	—N/a	Héloïse Mahieu	—N/a
Nancy	—N/a	—N/a	—N/a	Tyna Leclerc	—N/a	—N/a
Nord-Pas-de-Calais	—N/a	—N/a	—N/a	—N/a	—N/a	Anais Legrand
Normandy	Jennifer Waldorf	Yasmina Lopez	Claire Lamon (3rd)	—N/a	—N/a	Safietou Kabengele (W)
Nouvelle-Aquitaine	—N/a	Marine Comby (W)	Elodie Sirulnick (W)	Marion Dormignie (3rd)	—N/a	—N/a
Occitanie	Loline Brama	Cintia Santos	—N/a	—N/a	Fanny Julien Salva (3rd)	Chloe Maillot
Paris	—N/a	—N/a	—N/a	Léonie Akar	—N/a	Anais Legrand (3rd)
Pays de la Loire	—N/a	Hélène Pillu	—N/a	—N/a	Malaury Turpin	Malaury Turpin
Picardy	—N/a	—N/a	—N/a	—N/a	—N/a	Pauline Dubedat
Poitou-Charentes	—N/a	—N/a	—N/a	—N/a	Clemence Drouhuad (W)	Lara Evaristo
Provence	—N/a	—N/a	—N/a	—N/a	—N/a	Ilona Cassiano
Provence-Alpes-Côte d'Azur	—N/a	Ruth Malenge	—N/a	Lucie Carbone (W)	Oceane Ramella	—N/a
Réunion (La Réunion)	Laetitia Boyer ^{[β]} (2nd)	—N/a	—N/a	—N/a	—N/a	Kenya Nicol
Rhône-Alpes	—N/a	—N/a	—N/a	Kamilla Yahiaoui (1st)	—N/a	Jennifer Malleron
Total	9	13	5	10	9	17
Note^α: Won the supplementary title, Miss Face of Beauty France, and obtained the right to compete at Face of Beauty International^β: Later dominated herself as Réunion's representative at Miss Grand International 2019.
