= People's Choice =

People's Choice or The People's Choice may refer to:

== Awards ==
- People's Choice Awards, an American awards show
- People's Choice Award (disambiguation), other uses

== Literature ==
- The People's Choice (novel), a 1995 novel by Jeff Greenfield
- The People's Choice (Agar book), a book by Herbert Agar which won the Pulitzer Prize for History in 1934
- "The People's Choice" (short story), a 1932 short story by Erskine Caldwell included in We Are the Living
- The People's Choice, a book by American sociologist Paul Lazarsfeld

== Music ==
- People's Choice (album), a 2004 album by Sledgeback
- The People's Choice (album), an album by NoMeansNo
- People's Choice (band), a 1970s funk band
- The People's Choice: Music, an "experimental" music project that produced "The Most Wanted Song" and "The Most Unwanted Song" on CD

== Other uses ==
- Dixie Walker (1910–1982), American baseball player nicknamed "The People's Choice"
- People's Choice Party, a political party in New Zealand
- The People's Choice (TV series), a 1950s sitcom starring Jackie Cooper
- People's Choice, series of paintings statistically derived by polling populations of various countries, see: Komar and Melamid#People's Choice
- The People's Choice (political ticket), a political ticket that contests elections in Christchurch, New Zealand
