= People's Choice Award (disambiguation) =

The People's Choice Awards is an annual American awards ceremony for entertainment categories whose winners are chosen by polling the general public.

People's Choice Award or People's Choice Awards may also refer to:

== General entertainment ==
- People's Choice Awards (Australia) (1998–1999), based on the American ceremony
- People's Choice Awards India (2012), based on the American ceremony
- Asia Contents Awards & Global OTT Awards (Korea), since 2024 includes People's Choice actor and actress awards

== Film and television ==
- European Film Awards, several People's Choice Award categories, defunct (actor, actress, director) or renamed:
  - European Film Academy Lux Award, called the People's Choice Award for Best European Film from 1997 to 2019
- Toronto International Film Festival:
  - Toronto International Film Festival People's Choice Award, from 1978; since 2025 restricted to North American films
  - Toronto International Film Festival International People's Choice Award, added in 2025
- Eutelsat TV Awards (Europe), People's Choice Award for most popular channel
- Irish Film & Television Awards, various People's Choice Award categories 2003–2007

== Music ==
- Aotearoa Music People's Choice Award, New Zealand
- Gold Coast Music Awards (Australia), People's Choice Award for music act

== Comedy ==
- National Comedy Awards (UK), People's Choice Award for TV show (1997–2006) or comedian (2010–2013)

== Arts ==
- Telstra People's Choice Award, The Australian Ballet
- Archibald Prize § People's Choice Award, Australian portrait painting
- Salon des Refusés (Archibald) § People's Choice Award, Australian portrait and landscape painting

== Podcasts ==
- People's Choice Podcast Awards (United States)

== Sports ==
- ICC Awards § LG People's Choice Award, international cricket award 2010–2014

== See also ==
- Audience award
- Popularity contest
- People's Choice (disambiguation)
