= Briston =

Village in Norfolk, England

Coordinates: 52.853°N 1.059°E

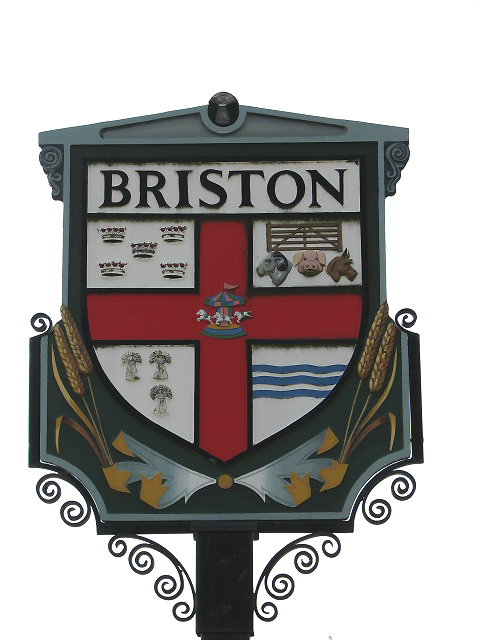
- Briston Village Sign

- Location within Norfolk
- Area: 11.96 km^{2} (4.62 sq mi)
- Population: 2,548 (parish, 2021 census)
  - Density: 213/km^{2} (550/sq mi)
- OS grid reference: TG060320
  - London: 125 miles (201 km)
- Civil parish: Briston CP
- District: North Norfolk
- Shire county: Norfolk
- Region: East
- Country: England
- Sovereign state: United Kingdom
- Post town: MELTON CONSTABLE
- Postcode district: NR24
- Dialling code: 01263
- Police: Norfolk
- Fire: Norfolk
- Ambulance: East of England
- UK Parliament: North Norfolk

Briston is a village, civil parish, and electoral ward in the English county of Norfolk. It is 3.5 miles (5.6 km) south-west of Holt and 19 miles (31 km) north-west of Norwich.

== History ==
In the Domesday Book, Briston is recorded as consisting of 22 households. The principal landowners were William the Conqueror and William de Warenne, who owned 60 acres (240,000 m^{2}) of land from which had been previously the property of Toke, a Saxon Thegn who had been evicted after the defeat of the Harold Godwinson at the Battle of Hastings. This land was farmed by three Free Men or and a further 280 acres (1.1 km^{2}) was farmed by fourteen bordars. There was woodland for 20 pigs which was valued at 16 shillings.

On the 17 August 1941, a Vickers Wellington of No. 12 Squadron RAF crashed close to the village killing three men out of a total crew of the six. The aircraft had left RAF Binbrook and, after a successful bombing raid over Cologne, was attempting a crash landing after suffering anti-aircraft fire. The three casualties are memorialised on a brass plaque in All Saints' Church.

== Geography ==
At the 2021 census, Briston had a population of 2,548, a slight increase from the 2011 census.

The village is located on the B1354, between Thursford and Saxthorpe. The nearest railway station is at Sheringham for the Bittern Line which runs between Sheringham, Cromer and Norwich but a steam line is also available from Holt to Sheringham. The nearest airport is Norwich International Airport.

== Religion ==
Briston's parish church, which is dedicated to All Saints, is Grade I listed. The church was largely built in the early 14th century. All Saints' was a round-tower church until 1795 when the tower was either demolished or collapsed and was not replaced. The church has medieval wall brasses as well as an iron cello, reputedly made by the village's blacksmith in the 17th century.

There is also a historic Congregationalist chapel dating to 1775 and a Methodist chapel from the late-18th century.

== Village amenities ==
Within the village there are a number of shops, including a post office. Astley Primary School is located in the village; secondary school students usually attend Reepham High School and College. There are three public houses in the village. On the outskirts of the village is the Three Horseshoes, a 16th-century building that has undergone large scale refurbishment. In the centre of the village the Explorers Bar.

The Pavilion, a local community facility, is used for a youth club and village events. Sporting facilities include a playing field with tennis courts, a skate park, a bowling green, and a children's playground.
