= Miss Grand International 2021 =

9th Miss Grand International Competition, beauty pageant edition

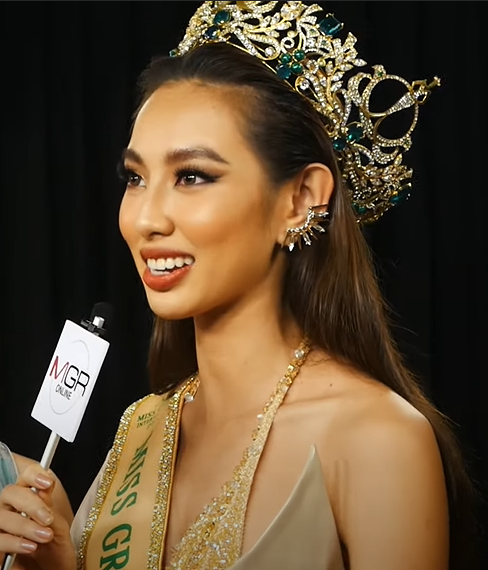
- Nguyễn Thúc Thùy Tiên, Miss Grand International 2021
- Date: 4 December 2021
- Presenters: Matthew Deane
- Venue: Show DC Hall, Bangkok, Thailand
- Broadcaster: YouTube; Facebook Live
- Entrants: 59
- Placements: 21
- Debuts: Bangladesh; Liberia; Siberia
- Withdrawals: Albania; Bashkortostan; Belarus; Bulgaria; China; Crimea; England; Finland; Iran; Ireland; Jamaica; Kenya; Kosovo; Poland; Scotland; Uruguay; Wales
- Returns: Angola; Armenia; Australia; Belgium; Curaçao; Haiti; Honduras; Hong Kong; Northern Ireland; Pakistan
- Winner: Nguyễn Thúc Thùy Tiên; Vietnam
- Best National Costume: Márcia de Menezes; Angola; Lishalliny Karanan; Malaysia; Samantha Batallanos; Peru
- Best in Swimsuit: Vivianie Díaz-Arroyo; Puerto Rico
- Best in Evening Gown: Indy Johnson; Thailand

Miss Grand International 2021 was the ninth Miss Grand International pageant, held at the Show DC hall, Show DC Mega Complex in Bangkok, Thailand, on 4 December 2021.

Abena Appiah of the United States crowned Nguyễn Thúc Thùy Tiên of Vietnam as her successor at the end of the event. The winner received a cash prize of US$60,000 as a reward.

== Background ==
=== Location and date ===
On 31 August 2021, the Miss Grand International organization publicized the promoted media on their social platforms citing that the grand final of the 9th Miss Grand International will take place in Phuket, Thailand, on 4 December 2021, while the ancillary events will commence prior, including; the national costume parade, the swimwear competition, and the preliminary round. All such events were set to launch after the registration date, which was scheduled for 17 November. However, the COVID-19 pandemic in Phuket caused all convention centers and theaters in the province, which once had the potential to host the important event, to be abandoned, and suffered a facility shortage. As a result, the organizer inevitably decided to reschedule most of the main events except the swimsuit competition, to be held in Bangkok instead.

Later on 6 October 2021, the organization additionally detailed the schedule of the preliminary activities on the island of Phuket as well as the main event in Bangkok; however, some ancillary activities was cancelled due to the opposing political views between the organizer and the pro-military government local community; which caused the application for property use to be revoked. The local government also declined to facilitate the event arrangement in the province.

=== Selection of participants ===
Of all fifty-nine participating candidates, only sixteen were determined through the Miss Grand national pageants, including Cambodia, Chile, Belgium, Ecuador, France, Italy, Japan, Liberia, Nicaragua, South Korea, Spain, Malaysia, Paraguay, Puerto Rico, Northern Ireland, and United States, while the representatives of Albania, England, Kosovo, Scotland, and Wales, who were also elected through the Miss Grand national pageants, did not enter the international contest for unknown reasons.

Three countries, the Dominican Republic, Mauritius, and Germany, sent their other pageant's main winner to compete. The remaining candidates were either appointed or obtained the title as a supplemental award at other national pageants, such as Manika Sheokhand of India, who was named Miss Grand India 2021 after finishing as the first runner-up in Femina Miss India 2020.

Initially, seventy-one contestants confirmed their participation but twelve withdrew, mostly due to the COVID-19 pandemic. Meanwhile, the original representatives of Argentina, Germany, Japan, Liberia, Nigeria, Panama, and Russia, were replaced by their runners-up or the appointed candidates after the resignation, dethronement, or changing of national licensee.

== Pageant format ==
Based on all accumulated scores, which included the scores from the preliminary round, the closed-door interviews, and other pageant activities, determined the twenty semifinalists who advanced to compete at the sportswear competition, in which the final nine finalists were elected. Eventually, nine semi-finalists, including the winner of the Miss Popular vote which was determined through public voting, completed the top ten and competed in the long gown, and the speech competitions. Afterward, the five finalists were chosen who then qualified for the question-and-answer round, where the winner and all four runners-up were determined.

== Results ==
=== Placements ===
Placement	Contestant
Miss Grand International 2021	Vietnam – Nguyễn Thúc Thùy Tiên
1st runner-up	Ecuador – Andrea Aguilera
2nd runner-up	Brazil – Lorena Rodrigues
3rd runner-up	Puerto Rico – Vivianie Díaz Arroyo
4th runner-up	South Africa – Jeanè Van Dam
Top 10	Cambodia – Sothida Pokimtheng §; Costa Rica – Adriana Moya; Indonesia – Sophia Louise Rogan; Spain – Alba Dunkerbeck; Venezuela – Vanessa Coello
Top 20	Angola – Márcia de Menezes; Australia – Angolina Amores; Colombia – Mariana Jaramillo; Dominican Republic – Stephanie Medina; France – Elodie Sirulnick; Germany – Luisa Victoria Malz; India – Manika Sheokand; Malaysia – Lishalliny Kanaran; Myanmar – Amara Shune Lei; Netherlands – Nathalie Yasmin Mogbelzada; Nigeria – Patience Christopher

§ – Voted into the Top 10 by viewers and awarded as Miss Popular Vote

=== Special awards ===
Award	Contestant
Best in Evening Gown	Thailand – Indy Johnson
Best in Swimsuit	Puerto Rico – Vivianie Díaz-Arroyo
Best National Costume	Angola – Márcia de Menezes; Malaysia – Lishalliny Kanaran; Peru – Samantha Batallanos
Miss Popular Vote	Cambodia - Sothida Pokimtheng

== Contestants ==
Fifty-nine contestants competed for the title.

Country/Territory	Contestant	Age	Hometown
Angola	Márcia de Menezes	27	Luanda
Argentina	Florence Melanie De Palo	24	Buenos Aires
Armenia	Kristina Ayanian	24	Boston
Australia	Angolina Amores	27	Sydney
Bangladesh	Marjana Chowdhury	28	Sylhet
Belgium	Zomkey Tenzin	20	Flemish Brabant
Bolivia	Eloísa Gutiérrez	25	Sucre
Brazil	Lorena Rodrigues	26	Juiz de Fora
Cambodia	Sothida Pokimtheng	23	Battambang
Canada	Olga Bykadorova	27	Montreal
Chile	Vanessa Echeverría	17	Calama
Colombia	Mariana Jaramillo	23	Barranquilla
Costa Rica	Adriana Moya	27	San José
Cuba	Geysel Vaillant	23	Havana
Curaçao	Kimberly Fernandes	25	Willemstad
Czech Republic	Barbora Aglerová	22	Prague
Dominican Republic	Stephanie Medina	22	New York
Ecuador	Andrea Aguilera	20	Ventanas
Egypt	Shahy Hamdy	25	Cairo
El Salvador	Iris Guerra	25	Santa Ana
France	Elodie Sirulnick	24	Paris
Germany	Luisa Victoria Malz	18	Berlin
Guatemala	María José Sazo	21	Escuintla
Haiti	Lynn Saint-Germain	27	Austin
Honduras	Celia Monterrosa	25	Santa Bárbara
Hong Kong	Sen Yang	22	Hong Kong
India	Manika Sheokhand	25	Haryana
Indonesia	Sophia Rogan	19	Bali
Italy	Marika Nardozi	21	Lazio
Japan	Chika Mizuno	25	Tokyo
Laos	Daomixay Phachansitthy	23	Savannakhet
Liberia	Hajamaya Mulbah	22	Monrovia
Malaysia	Lishalliny Karanan	24	Selangor
Mauritius	Naomi Buan	21	Curepipe
Mexico	Mariana Macías Ornelas	24	Chapala
Myanmar	Amara Shune Lei	25	Mandalay
Nepal	Ronali Amatya	25	Kathmandu
Netherlands	Nathalie Yasmin Mogbelzada	24	Amsterdam
Nicaragua	Epifanía Solís	22	Managua
Nigeria	Patience Christopher	23	Kogi
Northern Ireland	Shannon McCullagh	25	Belfast
Pakistan	Ramina Ashfaque	28	Karachi
Panama	Katie Nairobi Caicedo	20	Madrid
Paraguay	Andrea Jimena Sosa	21	Hohenau
Peru	Samantha Batallanos	26	Lima
Philippines	Samantha Panlilio	25	Cavite City
Portugal	Ana Laura Ferreira	19	Leiria
Puerto Rico	Vivianie Díaz-Arroyo	23	San Juan
Russia	Alesia Semerenko	27	Moscow
Siberia	Kristina Shenknekht	25	Moscow
South Africa	Jeanè Van Dam	20	Johannesburg
South Korea	Lee Ji-ho	24	Seoul
Spain	Alba Dunkerbeck	19	Canary Islands
Sri Lanka	Anna-Marie Ondaatje	21	Toronto
Sweden	Jennie Frondell	25	Tenhult
Thailand	Indy Johnson	23	Pathum Thani
United States	Madison Lynn Callaghan	25	Charlotte
Venezuela	Vanessa Coello	26	Maturín
Vietnam	Nguyễn Thúc Thùy Tiên	23	Ho Chi Minh City

== Vietnam / Thailand controversy ==
During the speech round of the top 10 finalists, Nguyễn Thúc Thùy Tiên of Vietnam, said in Thai: Make the world a better place for everyone, while raising a pro-democracy three-finger salute. This displeased supporters of the Thai military government, who presented letters of protest to the Vietnamese embassy in Bangkok. They said that her action interfered with Thai internal affairs, as the Constitutional Court of Thailand had determined that using this three-finger salute supported the overthrow of the Thai regime. Vietnam's Ministry of Foreign Affairs did not respond, causing some Thai government groups to state that they should take action and remind Thùy Tiên to refrain from making any statements that may affect Thailand–Vietnam relations.

Radio Free Asia reported that Thùy Tiên's speech with the pro-democracy three-finger salute had been censored by the Vietnamese government. After her win, Thùy Tiên received much public support for her action as seen in the Vietnamese media, but most was quickly removed, no longer accessible, or the details unmentioned. In many press-release videos, this section of the contest was also removed.
