= Poitou-Charentes =

Former administrative region in France

Coordinates: 46°05′N 0°10′E

- Region of France
- Flag Coat of arms

- Country: France
- Dissolved: 2016-01-01
- Prefecture: Poitiers
- Departments: 4: Charente (16); Charente-Maritime (17); Deux-Sèvres (79); Vienne (86)

Government
  - President: Jean-François Macaire (PS)

Area
  - Total: 25,809 km^{2} (9,965 sq mi)

Population (2007-01-01)
  - Total: 1,722,000
  - Density: 66.72/km^{2} (172.8/sq mi)

GDP
  - Total: €54.764 billion
  - Per capita: €30,300
- Time zone: UTC+1 (CET)
  - Summer (DST): UTC+2 (CEST)
- ISO 3166 code: FR-T
- NUTS Region: FR5
- Website: poitou-charentes.fr

Poitou-Charentes (French pronunciation: [pwatu ʃaʁɑ̃t]; Occitan: Peitau-Charantas; Poitevin-Saintongeais: Poetou-Chérentes) was an administrative region on the southwest coast of France. It comprised four departments: Charente, Charente-Maritime, Deux-Sèvres and Vienne. It included the historical provinces of Angoumois, Aunis, Saintonge and Poitou.

Poitiers was the regional capital. Other important cities were La Rochelle, Niort, Angoulême, Châtellerault, Saintes, Rochefort and Royan.

Poitou-Charentes was merged with Aquitaine and Limousin to form the new administrative region of Nouvelle-Aquitaine on 1 January 2016.

== Politics ==
The regional council was composed of 56 members.

== Demographics ==
In French, the region's residents were known as Picto-Charentais. In 2003, the region ranked 15th out of 26 in population. In area it ranked 12th in size.

Three regional languages, Poitevin, Saintongeais and Occitan (Limousin, Marchois) were spoken by a minority of people in the region.

Southern Poitou-Charentes and Aquitaine is believed to be the region of origin of the Acadian and Cajun populations of North America, such as in New Brunswick, Louisiana, Nova Scotia, Prince Edward Island, the Gaspé Peninsula of Quebec and Maine. Their ancestors emigrated from the region in the 17th and 18th centuries.

At first, these French immigrants from the rural areas of Poitou-Charentes settled in what is now eastern Canada, and established an agricultural and maritime economy (farming and fishing). This area of the New World was dubbed "Acadia" by the French, after the Greek Arcadia – the idyllic part of the Peloponnesian peninsula in Greece. As an alternate theory, some historians suggest that the name is derived from the indigenous Canadian Mi'kmaq language, in which Cadie means "fertile land". It was renamed Nova Scotia (New Scotland) in the aftermath of the 1755 expulsion of most of the Acadians by the English.

== History ==
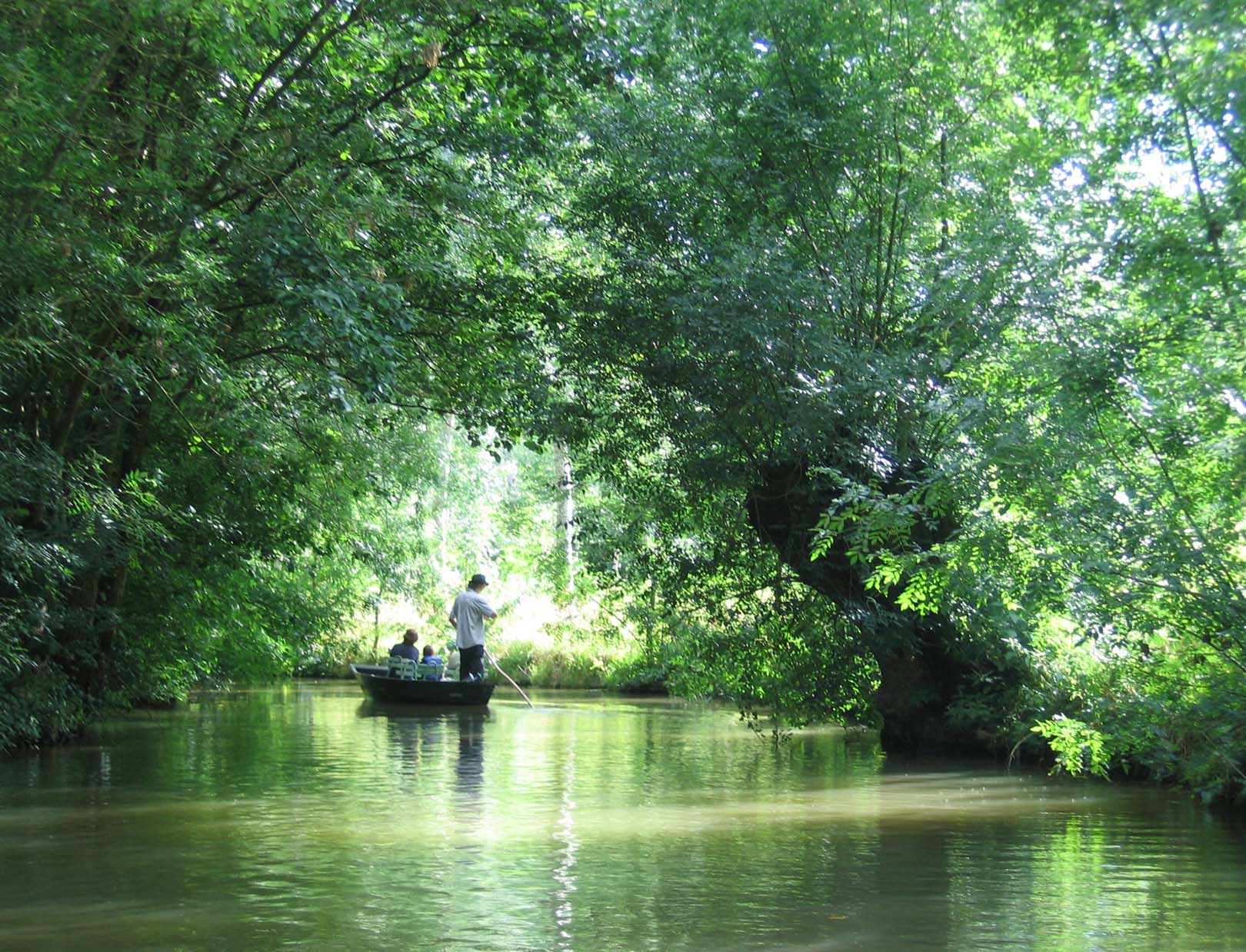
Marais Poitevin, Poitou-Charentes

Poitou is a historic region in west central France. Poitiers, the capital of the region, is its chief city, although the port of La Rochelle, capital of the province of Aunis, rivals it in economic importance. Farming is important to the economy; wheat, corn and cattle are farmed. Industries produce machinery, chemicals and dairy products.

The region's first known inhabitants, the Pictavi, a Gallic tribe, were conquered in 56 BC by the Romans, who then incorporated the area into Gaul as part of the province of Aquitania, with the Aquitani tribes. The Visigoths seized the region in 418 AD, but it passed to the Franks in 507. In 732 or 733, Charles Martel brought the Muslim invasion of Western Europe to a standstill by his victory in the Battle of Poitiers. From the 10th to the mid-12th century, the counts of Poitou were also the dukes of Aquitaine, and the city of Poitiers grew in importance.

In 1152, Poitou came under English control through the marriage of Eleanor of Aquitaine to Henry II (later king of England). The region was reunited with the French crown in 1416 and was a province of France until the Revolution (1789–1795), when it was divided into three departments, Vienne, Deux-Sèvres, and Vendée.

Françoise-Athénaïs, marquise de Montespan was born in the area in 1640 (d. 1707). She was the famous mistress to Louis XIV; Some of their descendants are still alive today.

== Major communities ==
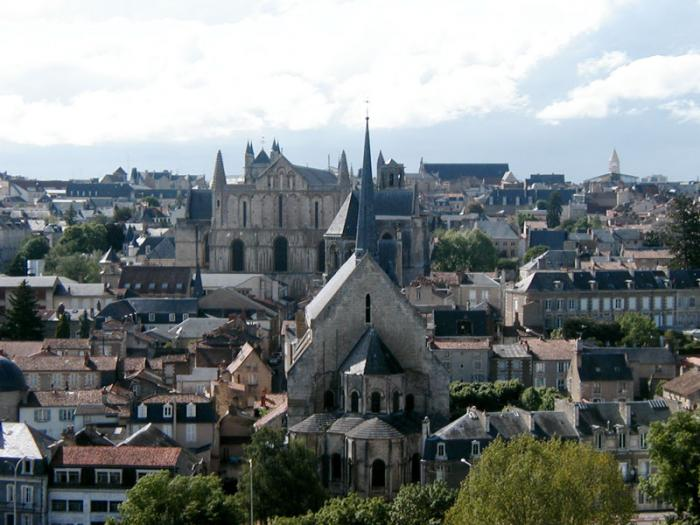
Poitiers

- Angoulême
- Bressuire
- Châtellerault
- Cognac
- La Rochelle
- Niort
- Melle
- Poitiers
- Rochefort
- Royan
- Saintes
