= Miss International 2016 =

56th Miss International pageant

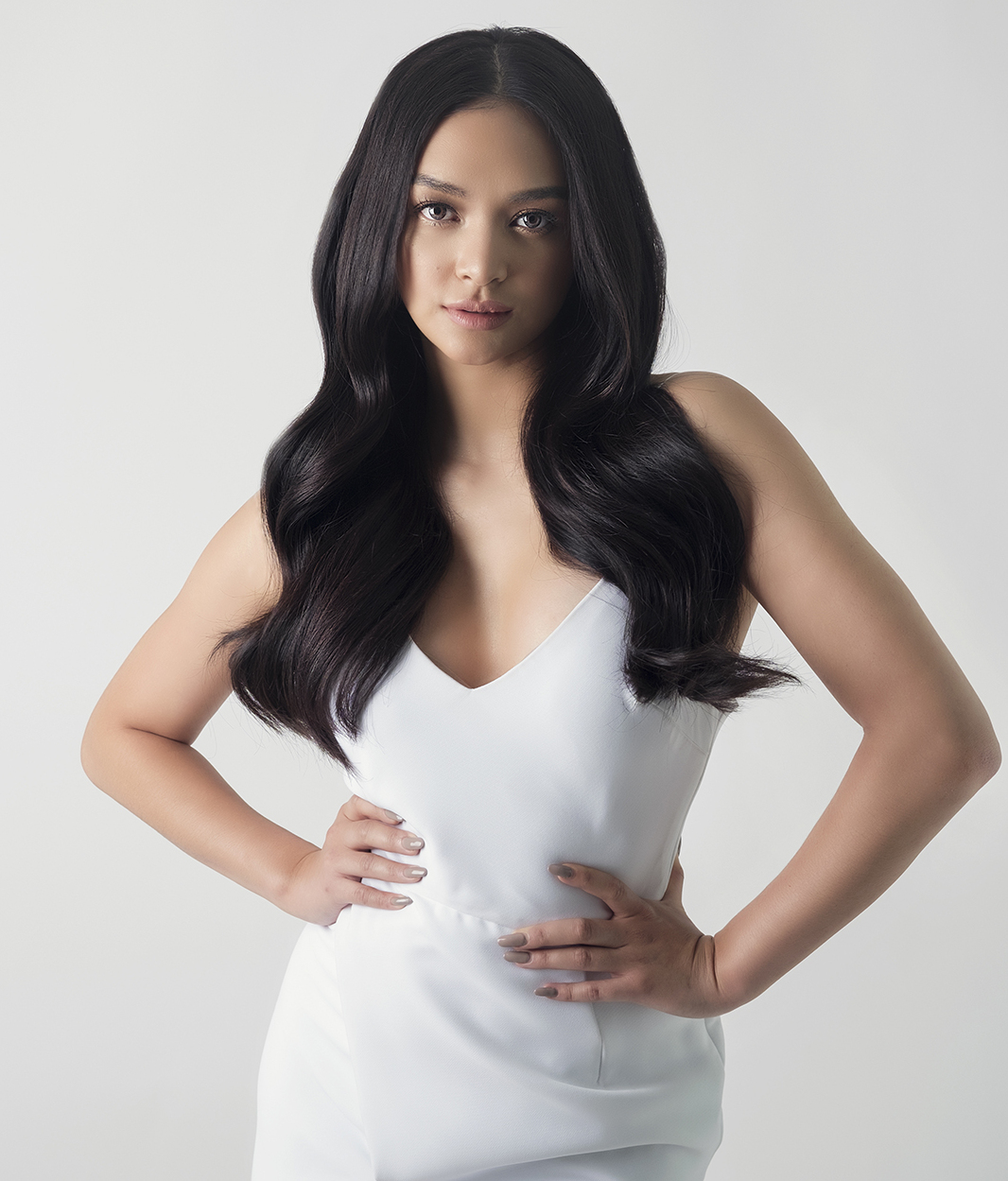
- Miss International 2016, Kylie Verzosa
- Date: October 27, 2016
- Presenters: Tetsuya Bessho; Amy Ota
- Entertainment: Matsuyama Ballet Company; StarLights
- Venue: Tokyo Dome City Hall, Tokyo, Japan
- Broadcaster: UStream; Niconico; PlayStation Network; YouTube
- Entrants: 69
- Placements: 15
- Debuts: Ghana; Sierra Leone
- Withdrawals: Italy; Kenya; Luxembourg; Mongolia; Paraguay; Romania; Turkey; Zambia
- Returns: Guatemala; Ireland; Nigeria; South Africa; Sweden
- Winner: Kylie Verzosa; Philippines
- Best National Costume: Brianny Chamorro; Nicaragua

Miss International 2016 was the 56th Miss International pageant, held at the Tokyo Dome City Hall in Tokyo, Japan, on October 27, 2016.

Edymar Martínez of Venezuela crowned Kylie Verzosa of the Philippines as her successor at the end of the event. This is the first time in Miss International history that the finals night saw the return of the previous year's runners-up to crown their respective successors.

== Background ==
On February 9, 2016, it was announced by Akemi Shimomura, president of the International Cultural Association, that the 2016 pageant would be held at Tokyo Dome City Hall, Tokyo, Japan for first consecutive year on Thursday, October 27, 2016.

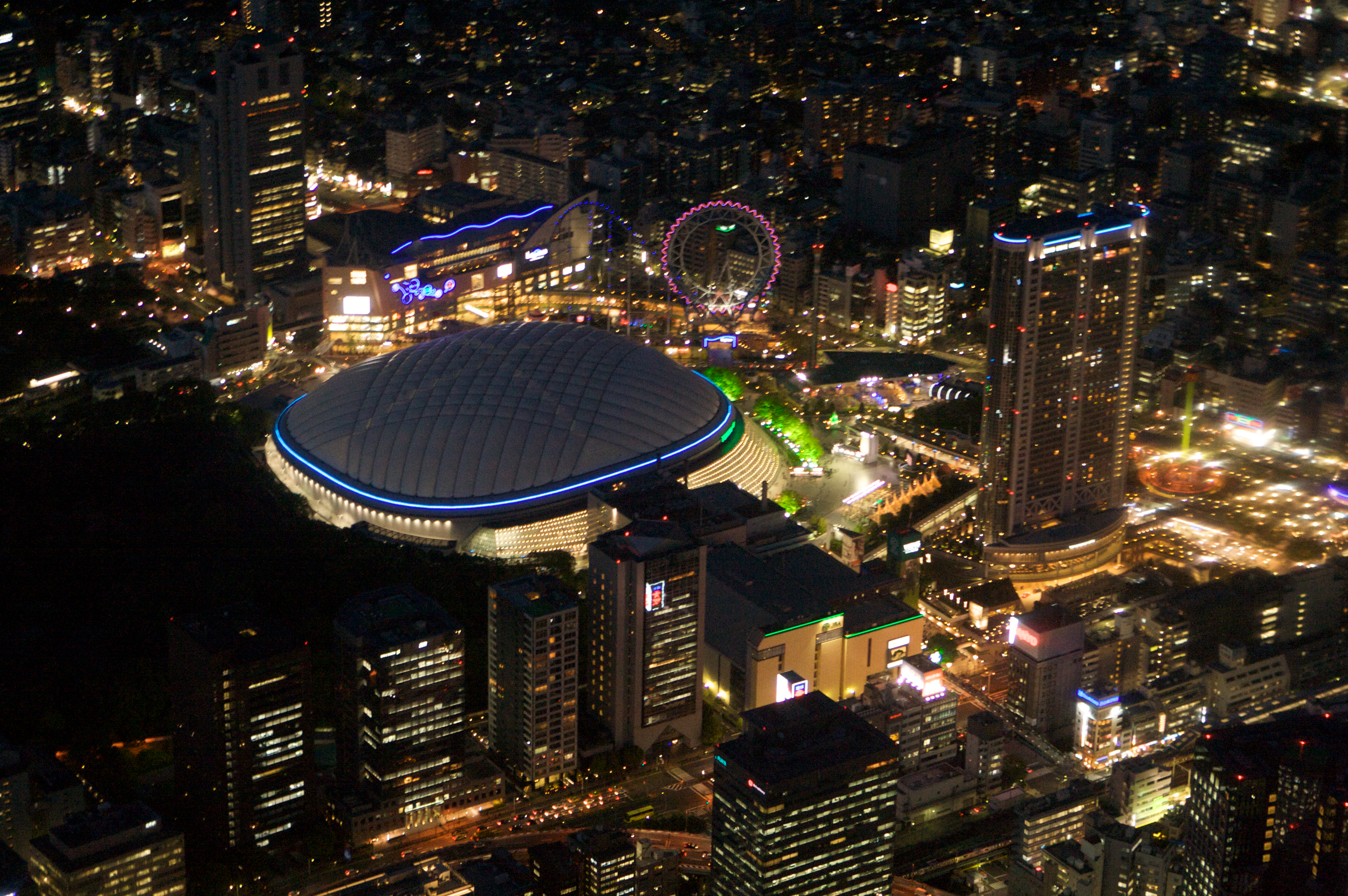
Tokyo Dome City Hall at night

== Result ==
=== Placements ===
Placement	Contestant
Miss International 2016	Philippines – Kylie Verzosa
1st Runner-Up	Australia – Alexandra Britton
2nd Runner-Up	Indonesia – Felicia Hwang Yi Xin
3rd Runner-Up	Nicaragua – Brianny Chamorro
4th Runner-Up	United States – Kaitryana Leinbach
Top 15	Argentina – Yoana Don; Canada – Amber Bernachi; Dominican Republic – Cynthia Núñez; El Salvador – Elizabeth Cader; Finland – Emilia Seppänen; Japan – Jyunna Yamagata; Mexico – Geraldine Ponce; Poland – Magdalena Bieńkowska; Russia – Alisa Manyonok; Thailand – Pattiya Pongthai

=== Continental Queens ===
Continental group	Contestant
Africa	Sierra Leone – Maseray Swarray
Americas	Ecuador – Ivanna Abad
Asia	Hong Kong – Kelly Chan
Europe	Netherlands – Melissa Scherpen
Oceania	Hawaii – Guinevere Davenport

=== Special awards ===
Awards	Contestant
Best National Costume	Nicaragua – Brianny Chamorro
Miss Best Dresser	Indonesia – Felicia Hwang Yi Xin
Miss Perfect Body	Moldova – Alina Chirciu
Miss Visit Japan Tourism Ambassador	Vietnam – Phạm Ngọc Phương Linh

=== Top 15 ===
1. Nicaragua
2. Indonesia
3. Finland
4. Mexico
5. United States
6. Japan
7. El Salvador
8. Canada
9. Dominican Republic
10. Argentina
11. Philippines
12. Australia
13. Russia
14. Thailand
15. Poland

== Contestants ==
69 contestants have been confirmed:

Country/Territory	Contestant	Age	Height	Hometown	Continental Group
Argentina	Yoana Don	25	177 cm (5 ft 10 in)	Selva	Americas
Aruba	Tania Nunes	20	175 cm (5 ft 9 in)	Oranjestad	Americas
Australia	Alexandra Britton	23	178 cm (5 ft 10 in)	Sutherland	Oceania
Belarus	Palina Tsehalka	24	172 cm (5 ft 8 in)	Slutsk	Europe
Belgium	Caroline van Hoye	26	170 cm (5 ft 7 in)	Brussels	Europe
Bolivia	Katherine Añazgo	20	172 cm (5 ft 8 in)	San Lorenzo	Americas
Brazil	Manoella Alves	21	176 cm (5 ft 9 in)	Natal	Americas
Canada	Amber Bernachi	26	165 cm (5 ft 5 in)	Windsor	Americas
China	Xinna Zhou	22	179 cm (5 ft 10 in)	Beijing	Asia
Colombia	Daniela Herrera	21	175 cm (5 ft 9 in)	Río de Oro	Americas
Costa Rica	Raquel Guevara	20	172 cm (5 ft 8 in)	San José	Americas
Cuba	Dania Quesada	25	168 cm (5 ft 6 in)	Havana	Americas
Denmark	Sara Danielsen	23	179 cm (5 ft 10 in)	Copenhagen	Europe
Dominican Republic	Cynthia Núñez	24	180 cm (5 ft 11 in)	San Francisco	Americas
Ecuador	Ivanna Abad	23	174 cm (5 ft 9 in)	Machala	Americas
El Salvador	Elizabeth Cader	20	170 cm (5 ft 7 in)	Santa Ana	Americas
Finland	Emilia Seppänen	22	176.5 cm (5 ft 9 in)	Helsinki	Europe
France	Khaoula Najine	25	170 cm (5 ft 7 in)	Roubaix	Europe
Ghana	Cindy Kofie	19	152 cm (5 ft 0 in)	Accra	Africa
Gibraltar	Joseanne Bear	24	173 cm (5 ft 8 in)	Gibraltar	Europe
Guadeloupe	Presile Adolphe	19	173 cm (5 ft 8 in)	Le Gosier	Americas
Guam	Annalyn Buan	23	169 cm (5 ft 7 in)	Hagåtña	Oceania
Guatemala	Laura Vadillo Urrutia	23	170 cm (5 ft 7 in)	Guatemala City	Americas
Haiti	Cassandre Joseph	23	172 cm (5 ft 8 in)	Port-au-Prince	Americas
Hawaii	Guinevere Davenport	21	167 cm (5 ft 6 in)	Hilo	Oceania
Honduras	Andrea Salinas	18	175 cm (5 ft 9 in)	Danli	Americas
Hong Kong	Kelly Chan	21	172 cm (5 ft 8 in)	Hong Kong	Asia
Hungary	Csillag Szabó	20	173 cm (5 ft 8 in)	Budapest	Europe
India	Rewati Chetri	23	173 cm (5 ft 8 in)	Guwahati	Asia
Indonesia	Felicia Hwang Yi Xin	24	173 cm (5 ft 8 in)	Bandar Lampung	Asia
(Republic of Ireland) Ireland	Katherine Gannon	25	173 cm (5 ft 8 in)	Galway	Europe
Japan	Junna Yamagata	22	164 cm (5 ft 5 in)	Tokyo	Asia
Lebanon	Stephanie Karam	24	170 cm (5 ft 7 in)	Mexico City	Asia
Macau	Sulin Ip	22	168 cm (5 ft 6 in)	Macau	Asia
Malaysia	Olivia Nicholas	23	171 cm (5 ft 7 in)	Ipoh	Asia
Mauritius	Shavina Hulkua	24	168 cm (5 ft 6 in)	Port Louis	Africa
Mexico	Geraldine Ponce	22	179 cm (5 ft 10 in)	Xalisco	Americas
Moldova	Alina Chirciu	20	175 cm (5 ft 9 in)	Chișinău	Europe
Myanmar	Inngyin Htoo	21	167 cm (5 ft 6 in)	Mandalay	Asia
Nepal	Barsha Lekhi	23	170 cm (5 ft 7 in)	Saptari District	Asia
Netherlands	Melissa Scherpen	18	174 cm (5 ft 9 in)	Emmen	Europe
New Zealand	Jessica Tyson	23	173 cm (5 ft 8 in)	Auckland	Oceania
Nicaragua	Brianny Chamorro	22	168 cm (5 ft 6 in)	Managua	Americas
Nigeria	Ivie Mary Young Akpude	22	179 cm (5 ft 10 in)	Lagos	Africa
Northern Mariana Islands	Peachy Quitugua	21	164 cm (5 ft 5 in)	Saipan	Oceania
Norway	Camilla Devik	20	175 cm (5 ft 9 in)	Namsos	Europe
Panama	Daniela Ochoa Barragan	22	170 cm (5 ft 7 in)	Panama City	Americas
Peru	Danea Panta	26	175 cm (5 ft 9 in)	Trujillo	Americas
Philippines	Kylie Verzosa	24	174 cm (5 ft 9 in)	Baguio	Asia
Poland	Magdalena Bieńkowska	23	173 cm (5 ft 8 in)	Mikołajki	Europe
Portugal	Carina Frazão	20	170 cm (5 ft 7 in)	Lisbon	Europe
Puerto Rico	Gabriela Berríos	25	175 cm (5 ft 9 in)	San Juan	Americas
Russia	Alisa Mankyonok	21	182 cm (6 ft 0 in)	Vladivostok	Europe
Sierra Leone	Maseray Swarray	19	170 cm (5 ft 7 in)	Freetown	Africa
Singapore	Wang Hui Qi	20	175 cm (5 ft 9 in)	Singapore	Asia
(Slovakia) Slovak Republic	Michaela Meňkyová	22	179 cm (5 ft 10 in)	Nitra	Europe
South Africa	Tharina Botes	19	179 cm (5 ft 10 in)	Roodepoort	Africa
South Korea	Min Jeong Kim	21	180 cm (5 ft 11 in)	Daegu	Asia
Spain	Anabel Delgado Torres	21	170 cm (5 ft 7 in)	Madrid	Europe
Sri Lanka	Ayesha Fernando	25	174 cm (5 ft 9 in)	Colombo	Asia
Sweden	Maria Taipaleenmäki	19	177 cm (5 ft 10 in)	Halmstad	Europe
Taiwan	Ai-Ning Tan	18	163 cm (5 ft 4 in)	Taipei	Asia
Thailand	Pattiya Pongthai	24	178 cm (5 ft 10 in)	Yala	Asia
Tunisia	Hiba Telmoudi	25	178 cm (5 ft 10 in)	Gabes	Africa
Ukraine	Viktoria Kiose	23	172 cm (5 ft 8 in)	Odesa	Europe
United Kingdom	Romy Simpkins	22	168 cm (5 ft 6 in)	Bournemouth	Europe
United States	Kaityrana Leinbach	18	173 cm (5 ft 8 in)	Charlotte	Americas
Venezuela	Jessica Duarte	24	177 cm (5 ft 10 in)	Caracas	Americas
Vietnam	Phạm Ngọc Phương Linh	19	173 cm (5 ft 8 in)	Ho Chi Minh City	Asia

== Notes ==
=== Debuts ===
- Ghana
- Sierra Leone

=== Returns ===
Last competed in 1994:

- Ireland

Last competed in 2007:

- Nigeria

Last competed in 2013:

- South Africa

Last competed in 2014:

- Guatemala
- Sweden

=== Withdrawals ===
- Italy - No pageant.
- Kenya - No pageant.
- Luxembourg - Did not compete.
- Mongolia - No pageant.
- Paraguay - Tatiana Rolín has been selected as Miss Internacional Paraguay 2016 seven days before the pageant begins. She will not compete in this edition due to schedule time and visa requirement. She will be competing at the next edition of Miss International pageant.
- Romania - No pageant.
- Turkey - Çagla Çukurova has been selected as Miss Turkey International 2016. Due to schedule time and visa requirement, she cannot compete at the Miss International 2016.
- Zambia - No pageant.
