= Miss Grand Argentina =

Argentina beauty pageant contest

- Formation: 2013
- Headquarters: Buenos Aires
- Location: Argentina
- Official language: Spanish
- National director: Malena Gonzalez (2025)
- Affiliations: Miss Grand International

Miss Grand Argentina
licensees timeline

Stand-alone pageant
Appointed titleholder
No licensee/titleholder

Miss Grand Argentina is the national pageant that chooses a contestant to represent Argentina at Miss Grand International. The title was mentioned for the first time in 2013 when the winner of Reina Nacional del Carnaval, Susel Jacquet, was chosen to represent the country at the inaugural edition of Miss Grand International in Thailand. The franchise was then transferred to different organizers every few years, including Sambrizzi Producción of Mathias Sambrizzi in 2023 and Malena Gonzalez in 2025.

Since their debut in 2013, Argentina's representatives have not won Miss Grand International. The highest was Mariana Varela who reached the top 10 n 2020.

== History ==
Argentina appeared at the first Miss Grand International in 2013. All contestants were appointed, with no preliminary national pageants. The franchise license was previously managed by several organizers including Iron Tree SRL in 2021 and 2022, and a Buenos Aires-based event organizer, Sambrizzi Producción, from 2023 to 2024.

In 2021, the former licensee, Marcelo Shaya, was unable to meet the contest's international requirements due to a lack of funds. This caused the original contestant, Alina Luz Akselrad, to withdraw and be replaced by Florencia de Palo, who was appointed by a new licensee, Tais Ibarra of Iron Tree SRL.

== Contest ==
=== Location and date ===
The stand-alone Miss Grand Argentina pageant took place only once, in August 2025.

Edition	Date	Final venue	Entrants	Ref.
1st	27 August	Teatro Ateneo Cecilia Bernasconi, Buenos Aires	12	

=== Competition result ===
Edition	Winner	Runners-up				Ref.
Edition	Winner	First	Second	Third	Fourth	Ref.
1st	Elena Mateo (Tucumán)	Selene Bublitz (Corrientes)	Caro Elsegood (Buenos Aires)	Julieta Pérez Castellanos (Islas del Atlántico Sur)	Luisina Sendra (Cataratas)	

== International competition ==
The following is a list of Argentina representatives at the Miss Grand International contest.

Color keys

- : Declared as the winner
- : Ended as a runner-up (Top 5)
- : Ended as a finalist (Top 10)
- : Ended as a semifinalist (Top 20/21)
- : Ended as special awards winner

Year	Province	Miss Grand Argentina	Title	Placement	Special Awards	National Director
Did not compete in 2026
2025	Tucumán	Elena Mateo	Miss Grand Argentina 2025	Unplaced		Malena Gonzalez
2024	Córdoba	Alejandra Morales	Appointed	Unplaced		Mathias Sambrizzi
2023	Pirané	Natalia Cometto	Appointed	Unplaced		Mathias Sambrizzi
2022	Buenos Aires	Camila Barraza	Miss Universe Kosovo 2016	Unplaced		Tais Ibarra
2021	Buenos Aires	Florencia de Palo	Top 7 Miss Universe Argentina 2019	Unplaced		Tais Ibarra
2021	Córdoba	Alina Luz Akselrad	Top 7 Miss Universe Argentina 2019	Did not compete		Marcelo Shaya
2020	Buenos Aires	Mariana Varela	Miss Universe Argentina 2019	Top 10		Marcelo Shaya
2019	Buenos Aires	Agustina Epelde	Appointed	Did not compete		Marcelo Shaya
2018	Córdoba	Julieta Riveros	Appointed	Unplaced		Marcelo Shaya
2017	Santiago del Estero	Yoana Don	Miss World Argentina 2014	Unplaced		Marcelo Shaya
Did not compete in 2016
2015	Córdoba	Sol Chaves Aguilar	Appointed	Did not compete		Nadia Cerri
2014	Buenos Aires	Nadina Vallinai	Appointed	Unplaced		Nadia Cerri
2013	Corrientes	Susel Jacquet	Reina Nacional del Carnaval 2013	Unplaced		Nadia Cerri

== Winner gallery ==
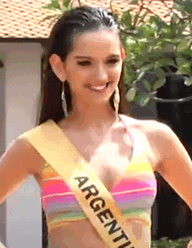
Nadina Vallina (2014)

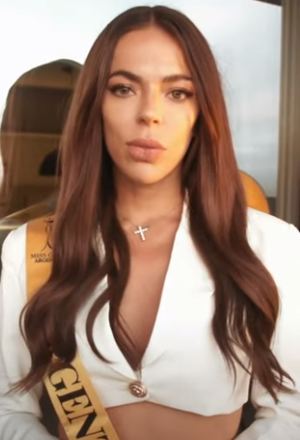
Natalia Cometto (2023)

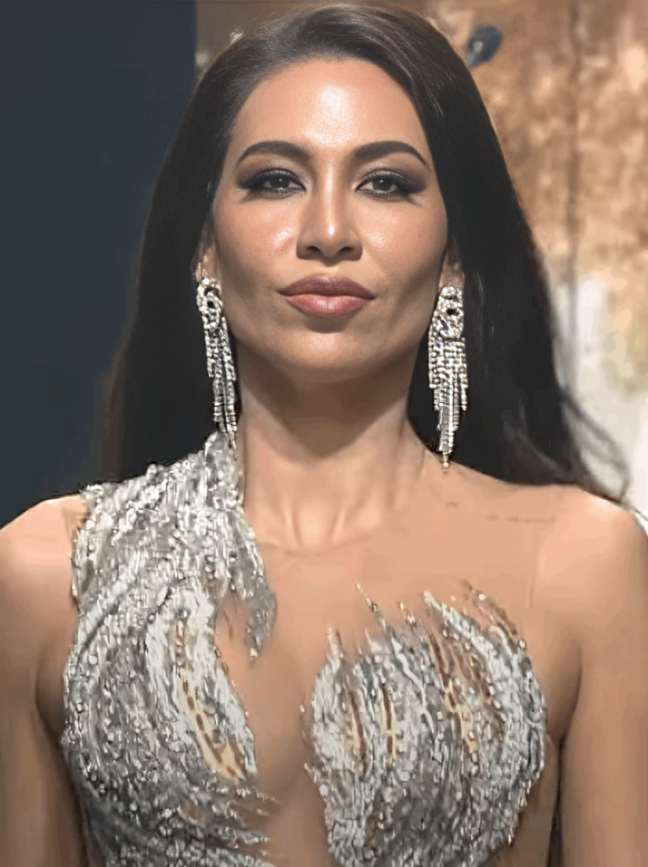
Alejandra Morales (2024)

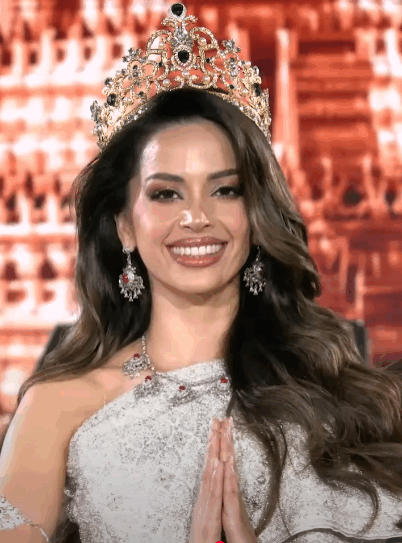
Elena Mateo (2025)

== National pageant candidates ==
=== Participating regional and territories representatives ===
Regional/territories	1st
Antártida	Y
Buenos Aires	
Cataratas	
Ciudad Autónoma de Buenos Aires	Y
Corrientes	
Islas del Atlántico Sur	
Jujuy	Y
Misiones	Y
Noroeste	7
Salta	7
Selva Misionera	Y
Tucumán	
Total	12
Color keys: : Declared as the winner; : Ended as a 1st runner-up; : Ended as a 2nd runner-up; : Ended as a 3rd runner-up; : Ended as a 4th runner-up; A : Ended as a finalist, semifinalist and unplaced; × : Ended as withdrew during the competition; × : Ended as no representative
