= Miss Grand Belgium =

National beauty pageant in Belgium

- Established: 18 September 2021; 5 years ago
- Founder: Carolyn Collinda
- Type: Beauty pageant
- Headquarters: Brussels
- Location: Belgium
- Members: Miss Grand International
- Official language: English
- President: Darline Devos
- Parent organization: Miss Belgium (2025-Present)
- Website: www.theccproductions.com

Miss Grand Belgium licensee timeline

Miss Grand Belgium is an annual Belgian female beauty pageant based in Lint, Belgium. It was founded in 2021 by the event organizer, CC Productions, which is managed by Nepali businessperson Carolyn Collinda. The contest winners represent Belgium at its parent international platform, Miss Grand International.

Previously, Belgium representatives at the Miss Grand International pageant were appointed by different licensees, but none of them placed at the aforementioned international pageant at that time; until Jane Baesen of 2025 became the first Belgian to be placed, securing her position in the Top 22.

== History ==
Belgium is one of the countries that has participated in the Miss Grand International contest since its inception in 2013. Nevertheless, most of its representatives have been chosen without organizing a national contest. However, after Carolyn Collinda, the Netherlands-born businessperson, obtained the license in 2021, she subsequently organized the first Miss Grand Belgium contest on September 18, 2021, at AED Studios in the city of Lint. The contest featured eight national finalists, and Tenzin Zomkey, who was born in India's Tibetan refugee camp and resided in Flemish Brabant, was crowned Miss Grand Belgium 2021.

In 2022, the original winner, Alyssa Gilliaert, resigned from the title due to health problems, which caused the organizer to appoint one of the national finalists, Chiara Vanderveeren, to compete at the Miss Grand International 2022 in Indonesia instead.

== Editions ==
The following is a list of Miss Grand Belgium edition details, since its inception in 2021.

Edition	Date	Final Venue	Entrants	Winner	Ref.
1st	18 September 2021	AED Studios, Lint	8	Tenzin Zomkey	
2nd	9 July 2022	AED Studios, Lint	8	Alyssa Gilliaert	
3rd	25 June 2023	AED Studios, Lint	8	Albertina Rodrigues	
4th	15 June 2024	AED Studios, Lint	11	Jennifer Louise Felix	

== International competition ==
The following is a list of Belgium representatives at Miss Grand International competition.

Color keys

- : Declared as the winner
- : Ended as a runner-up (Top 5)
- : Ended as a finalist (Top 10)
- : Ended as a semifinalist (Top 20/21)
- : Ended as special awards winner

Year	City	Miss Grand Belgium	National title (Title obtained from the national pageant)	Competition performance		National director
Year	City	Miss Grand Belgium	National title (Title obtained from the national pageant)	Placement	Special awards	National director
2026	Bierges	Emily Baesen	Miss Grand Belgium 2026	Top 25		Darline Devos
2025	Bierges	Jane Baesen	1st runner-up Miss Belgium 2025	Top 22		Darline Devos
2024	Heuvelland	Jennifer Louise Felix	Miss Grand Belgium 2024	Unplaced		Carolyn Collinda
2023	Liège	Albertina Rodrigues	Miss Grand Belgium 2023	Unplaced		Carolyn Collinda
2022	Brussels	Chiara Vanderveeren	Finalist Miss Grand Belgium 2022	Unplaced		Carolyn Collinda
2022	Brussels	Alyssa Gilliaert	Miss Grand Belgium 2022	Did not compete		Carolyn Collinda
2021	Leuven	Zomkey Tenzin	Miss Grand Belgium 2021	Unplaced		Carolyn Collinda
Did not compete between 2019–2020
2018	Brussels	Elisabeth Moszkowicz	1st runner-up Miss Brussel 2019	Unplaced		Elisabeth Moszkowicz
2017	Antwerp	Rachel Nimegeers	Miss Supranational Belgium 2015	Unplaced		Miss Toerisme; Organisatie Benelux
2016	Gembloux	Kawtar Riahi Idrissi	Top 12 Miss Belgium 2015	Unplaced		Miss Toerisme; Organisatie Benelux
2015	Limburg	Rana Özkaya	Appointed	Unplaced		Annick Eycken
2015	Brussels	Axelle Stratsaert	1st runner-up Miss Exclusive 2015	Did not compete		Annick Eycken
2014	Malle	Sarah De Groof	Top 20 Miss Tourism Belgium 2012	Unplaced		Annick Eycken
2013	Limburg	Karolien Termonia	Appointed	Unplaced		Miss Exclusive Belgium Org.

== Gallery ==
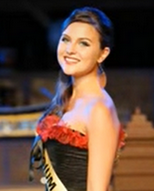
Sarah De Groof (2014)

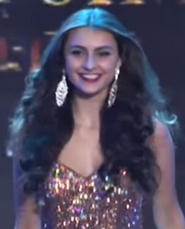
Rana Özkaya (2015)

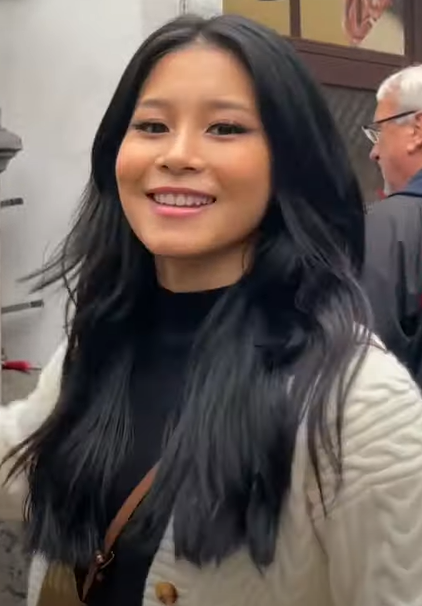
Zomkey Tenzin (2021)

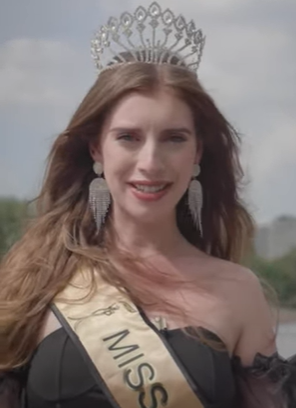
Alyssa Gilliaert (2022)

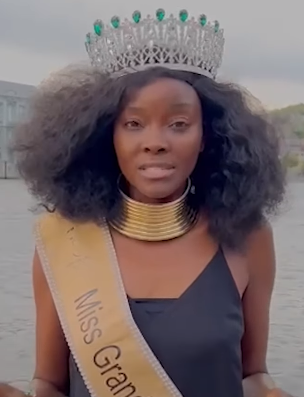
Albertina Rodrigues (2023)

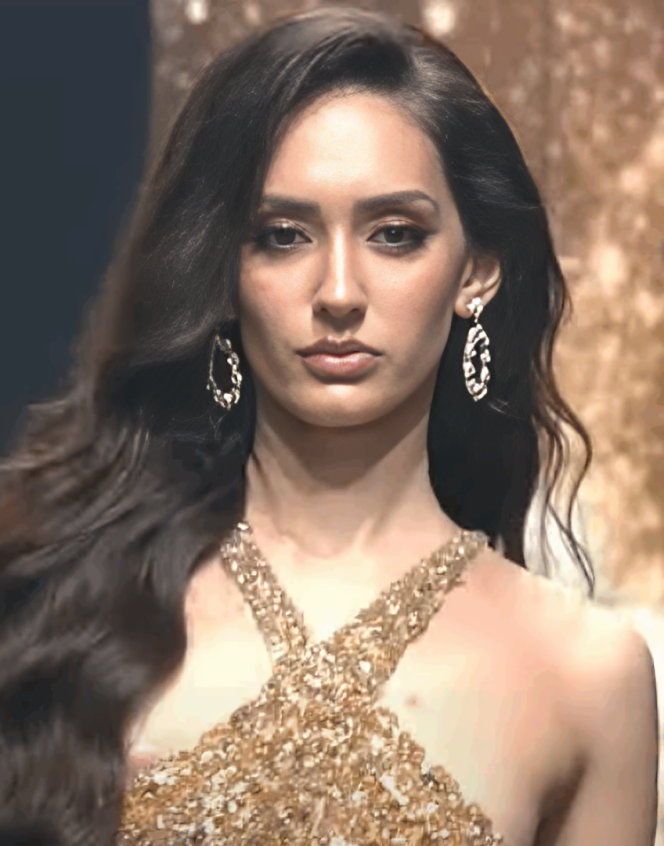
Jennifer Louise (2024)

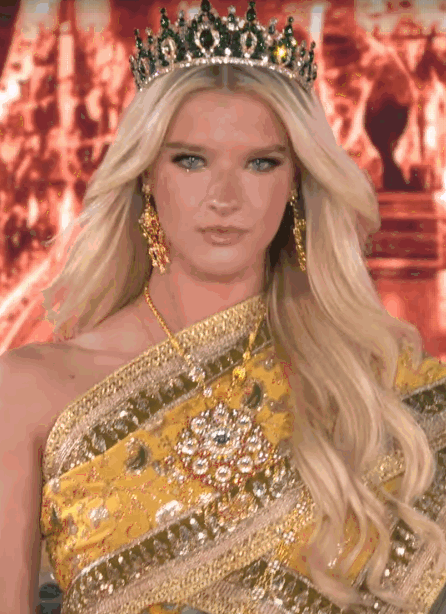
Jane Baesen (2025)

Emily Baesen (2026)

== National finalists ==
The following list is the national finalists of the Miss Grand Belgium pageant, as well as the competition results.

Color keys
A Declared as the winner
Ended as a runner-up
Ended as a semifinalist
Ended as a quarterfinalist
– Did not participate
Withdraw during the competition

Year Province	2021	2023
Antwerp	Veronique Michielsen	Julie Vansant
Brussels	Souad Lips	Hillary Hartmann
East Flanders	Aiona Santana	Morgana Billiet
Flemish Brabant	Tenzin Zomkey	Feline Verhaegen
Hainaut	Imaine Khoudairi	—N/a
Liège	Thanaree Scheerlinck	Albertina Rodrigues
Limburg	Noor Beldjoudi	Ioana Moldoveanu
Luxembourg	—N/a	Angie Frimps
Namur	—N/a	—N/a
Walloon Brabant	Laurine Remans	Kenza Michael Zerrouki
West Flanders	—N/a	Amber Dobbels
Total	8	9

=== 2022 : National Finalists ===
Miss Grand Belgium National Finalists
Year No.	2022
1	Anke
2	Alyssa
3	Chiara
4	Denisa
5	Elisa
6	Liliana
7	Sarah
8	Theresia
