= Miss Grand Costa Rica 2022 =

1st Miss Grand Costa Rica competition, beauty pageant edition

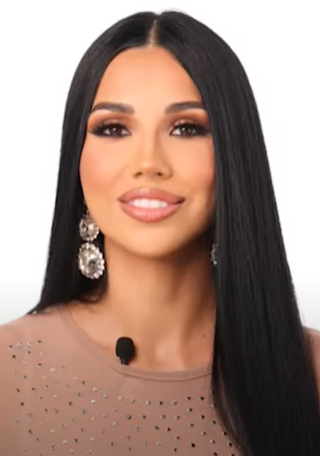
- Brenda Muñoz of Guanacaste, the winner of the contest
- Date: 7 July 2022
- Presenters: Catalina Murillo; Sasa Gomez; Henry B. Wood
- Venue: Eugene O'Neill Theatre, San José, Costa Rica
- Broadcaster: YouTube
- Entrants: 12
- Placements: 5
- Winner: Brenda Muñoz (Guanacaste)

External videos
- Grand Final

Miss Grand Costa Rica 2022 was the first edition of the Miss Grand Costa Rica beauty pageant, held at the Eugene O'Neill Theatre in San José on 7 July 2022. Twelve contestants, chosen to participate directly through the national casting held by the Concurso Nacional de Belleza de Costa Rica (CNB Costa Rica), competed for the title, of whom a 28-year-old model from Guanacaste, Brenda Muñoz, was named the winner. She then represented Costa Rica in the Miss Grand International 2022 pageant held on October 25 in Indonesia, but got a non-placement.

The event was hosted by Catalina Murillo, Sasa Gomez, and Henry Wood.

Following the end of the international tournament, due to such an unsatisfactory competition result, some Costa Ricans accused the national organizers of a lack of preparation and mismanagement of Brenda's English language training before entering the international contest. The country's licensee, Erick Solís, was also blamed for using Brenda only for business purposes.

== Results ==
=== Final placements ===
Miss Grand Costa Rica 2022 competition results by province
Color key:
Winner	1st RU
2nd runner-up	Top 5
Unplaced	Withdrew

Position	Delegate
Miss Grand Costa Rica 2022	Guanacaste – Brenda Muñoz
1st runner-up	Puerto Viejo – Maria Alejandra
2nd runner-up	San Isidro de El General – Isabella Oldenburg
Top 5	Heredia – Ciany Salazar; Heredia City – Sofía Rojas

=== Grand final selection committee ===
The following list is the panel of judges for the grand final competition of the Miss Grand Costa Rica 2022 pageant.

- Andrea Aguilera Paredes – First runner-up Miss Grand International 2021 from Ecuador
- Maricrís Rodríguez – Miss United Continents Costa Rica 2019
- Adriana Moya – Miss Grand Costa Rica 2021
- Gabriela Jara – Miss Grand Costa Rica 2020
- Brenda Castro – Miss Grand Costa Rica 2019
- Amalia Matamoros – Miss Grand Costa Rica 2017
- Viviana Rodríguez – CEO of WM Top Models Agency
- Daniel Meza – Sales director of the Dreams Las Mareas Hotel
- Alejandro Venegas – Regional director of the sports facility brand, Penalty

== Contestants ==
Twelve contestants competed for the title of Miss Grand Costa Rica 2022.

Province	Candidate	Age	Hometown
Alajuela	Tabatha Delgado Calvo	20	Alajuela
Cartago	Dennhuá Arguedas Ortiz	19	Tres Ríos
Cartago City (CA)	Shaony Richard Blanco	26	Cartago
Guanacaste	Brenda Muñoz Hernández	28	Liberia
Heredia	Ciany Salazar Chavarría	22	Heredia
Heredia City (HE)	Sofía Rojas Zamora	20	Heredia
Limón	Dorsa Saffarian Zolfaghari	17	Heredia
Puerto Viejo (HE)	Maria Alejandra Acosta García	20	Heredia
Puntarenas	Celeste Ulloa Mora	21	Rohrmoser
San Isidro de El General (SJ)	Isabella Oldenburg Zamora	22	Santa Ana
San José	Camila Calvo Tobón	27	San José
San José City (SJ)	Kimberly Saballos Alpízar	25	Santa Ana
