= Silvana Sánchez =

Costa Rican model (born 1990)

Silvana Sanchez Jimenez
- Born: Silvana Sánchez Jiménez; 1990 (age 34–35); Heredia, Costa Rica
- Height: 1.80 m (5 ft 11 in)
- Beauty pageant titleholder
- Title: Miss World Costa Rica 2012 (Winner); Miss World 2012 (Unplaced)
- Hair color: Black
- Eye color: Brown

Silvana Sánchez Jiménez; (born 1990) is a Costa Rican designer and beauty pageant titleholder who was crowned Miss World Costa Rica 2012 and represented her country in the Miss World 2012 pageant.

== Early life ==
Silvana was born in Heredia, Costa Rica, and grew up in Palmares, Alejuela, Costa Rica. She attended High School at Liceo Experimental Bilingue de Naranjo, graduating in 2006. She is studied graphic design at Universidad Veritas in San José, Costa Rica.

== National Geography Championship ==
Silvana won the National Geography Championship for Costa Rica high school students in 2004. She represented Costa Rica in the World Geography Championship hosted by National Geographic Magazine in Budapest, Hungary in the same year.

== Notable Pageant Placements ==
- Miss Teen Rica 2006 (Winner)
- Miss Teen Expoworld 2006 (Winner)
- Miss Tourism Millennium 2007 (First runner-up)
- Miss Teen International 2007 (Second runner-up)
- Miss Oriental Tourism 2012 (5th place)

== Miss World Costa Rica 2012 ==
Silvana was crowned Miss World Costa Rica 2012 in the city of Heredia. She is 23 years old, and stands 1.80m tall. Silvana Sanchez represented Costa Rica in Miss World 2012 pageant, on August 18, in Ordos, Inner Mongolia, China.

== Miss World 2012 ==
Silvana competed at 62nd edition of the Miss World pageant but unplaced.

Awards and achievements
Preceded by Paola Chaverri	Reinas de Costa Rica; 2012	Succeeded by Yarly Marín Ledezma
