= Miss Grand Belgium 2023 =

3rd Miss Grand Belgium competition, beauty pageant edition

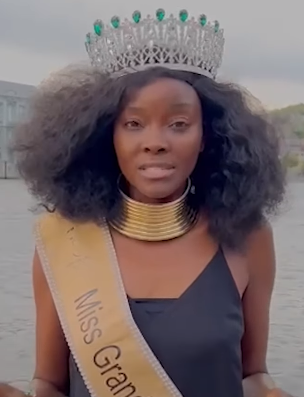
- Albertina Rodrigues, the winner of the contest
- Date: 25 June 2023
- Venue: AED Studios, Lint, Belgium
- Entrants: 8
- Placements: 3
- Winner: Albertina Rodrigues (Liège)

Miss Grand Belgium 2023 competition result by province
Colors key
| Winner | Unplaced |
| 1st runner-up | Withdrew |
| 2nd runner-up | No representative |

Miss Grand Belgium 2023 was the third edition of the Miss Grand Belgium pageant, held at the AED Studios in Lint, Belgium, on 25 June 2023. Eight candidates who qualified through the casting process competed for the title, of whom a nineteen-year-old professional model and social worker with Angolan decedent from Liège, Albertina Rodrigues, was elected the winner. Rodrigues then represented the country at the international pageant, Miss Grand International 2022, held in Vietnam in October 2023, but was unplaced.

The pageant was held in parallel with the Mister International Belgium 2023 pageant, in which the winner competed at the Mister International 2023 pageant, held on 17 September, in Bangkok, Thailand.

== Result ==
| Placement | Candidate |
|---|---|
| Miss Grand Belgium 2023 | Liège – Albertina Rodrigues |
| 1st runner-up | Flemish Brabant – Feline Verhaegen |
| 2nd runner-up | East Flanders – Morgana Billiet |
Special Awards
| Miss Personality | Limburg – Ioana Moldoveanu |
| Miss Social Media | Brussels – Hillary Hartmann |
| Miss Photogenic | West Flanders – Amber Dobbels |

== Candidates ==
Initially, nine candidates confirmed to participate, but Julie Vansant of Antwerp withdrew, making the finalized total of eight contestants.

- Antwerp – Julie Vansant (withdrew)
- Brussels – Hillary Hartmann
- East Flanders – Morgana Billiet
- Flemish Brabant – Feline Verhaegen
- Liège – Albertina Rodrigues
- Limburg – Ioana Moldoveanu
- Luxembourg – Angie Frimps
- Walloon Brabant – Kenza Michael-Zerrouki
- West Flanders – Amber Dobbels
