= Miss Grand Belgium 2021 =

1st Miss Grand Belgium competition, beauty pageant edition

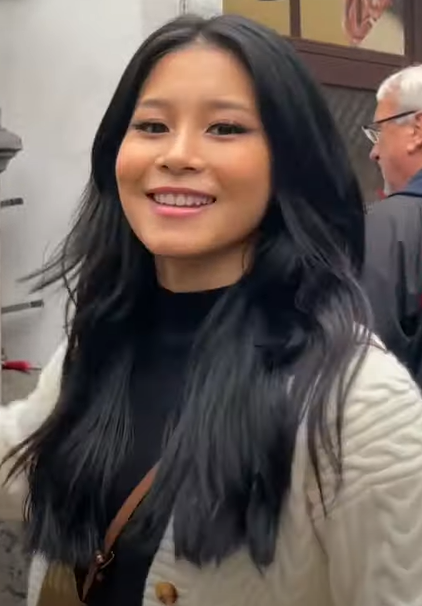
- Zomkey Tenzin, the winner of the contest
- Date: 28 September 2021
- Presenters: Vincent De Koninck; Veronique De Kock-Goossens
- Venue: AED Studios, Lint, Belgium
- Broadcaster: YouTube
- Entrants: 8
- Placements: 5
- Winner: Zomkey Tenzin (Flemish Brabant)
- Miss Personality: Zomkey Tenzin (Flemish Brabant)
- Miss Charity: Souad Lips (Brussels)

Miss Grand Belgium 2021 was the inaugural edition of the Miss Grand Belgium pageant, held at the AED Studios in Lint, Belgium, on 28 September 2021. Eight candidates who qualified through the casting process competed for the title, of whom a 19 years-old India-born Tibetan decedent, Zomkey Tenzin, won the main title and then represented Belgium at the Miss Grand International 2021 pageant in Thailand, but she was unplaced.

The event was hosted by Vincent De Koninck and Veronique De Kock-Goossens.

== Result ==
Placement	Candidate
Miss Grand Belgium 2021	Flemish Brabant – Tenzin Zomkey
1st runner-up	Brussels – Souad Lips
2nd runner-up	East Flanders – Aiona Santana
Top 5	Antwerp – Veronique Michielsen; Walloon Brabant – Laurine Remans
Special Awards
Miss Personality	Flemish Brabant – Tenzin Zomkey
Miss Charity	Brussels – Souad Lips

== Candidates ==
Eight candidates competed for the title of Miss Grand Belgium 2021.

- Antwerp – Veronique Michielsen
- Brussels – Souad Lips
- East Flanders – Aiona Santana
- Flemish Brabant – Tenzin Zomkey

- Hainaut – Imaine Khoudairi
- Liège – Thanaree Scheerlinck
- West Flanders – Noor Beldjoudi
- Walloon Brabant – Laurine Remans
