= Miss Grand International 2017 =

5th Miss Grand International Competition, beauty pageant edition

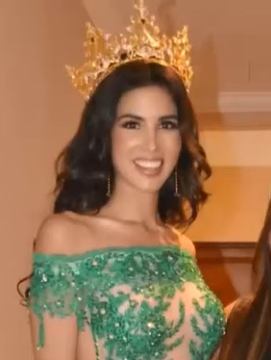
- María José Lora
- Date: October 25, 2017
- Presenters: Xian Lim; Nicole Cordoves
- Venue: Vinpearl Convention Center, Phú Quốc, Vietnam
- Broadcaster: Facebook live; MWD Series; MV Lao HD; Direc TV Network; MV Fivel; LetViet
- Entrants: 77
- Placements: 20
- Debuts: Fiji; Laos; Northern Ireland; Sierra Leone; Tatarstan
- Withdrawals: Albania; Aruba; Iraq; Italy; Latvia; Luxembourg; Malta; Mauritius; Moldova; Norway; Poland; Romania; Rwanda; Singapore; Suriname; Switzerland; Tahiti; Taiwan; Turkey; Uruguay
- Returns: Argentina; Belarus; Bulgaria; Cambodia; Chile; Finland; Germany; Guadeloupe; Haiti; Lebanon; Mongolia; Nepal; Serbia; Sweden; Tanzania; Uganda; United States Virgin Islands
- Winner: María José Lora; Peru
- Best National Costume: Dea Rizkita; Indonesia

Miss Grand International 2017 was the fifth Miss Grand International pageant, held at the Vinpearl Phu Quoc Resort and Villas Convention Hall in Phú Quốc, Vietnam, on October 25, 2017.

Ariska Putri Pertiwi of Indonesia crowned María José Lora of Peru as her successor at the end of the event.

== Background ==
=== Date and venue ===
On the grand final coronation night of the Miss Grand International 2016, held in Las Vegas, Nevada, on October 25, in addition to crowning the winner, the host of the event also announced that Vietnam had been selected as the venue to host next year's competition, making it the second time that Vietnam had been chosen to host the pageant since hosting the Miss Universe pageant in 2008. However, further schedule details have not been revealed at that moment.

Later, on October 26, 2016, Nguyễn Đăng Chương, Director General of the Department of Performing Arts, stated that the pageant activities is scheduled for the provinces of Quảng Bình, Thừa Thiên Huế and Kiên Giang from October 5–25, with grand final on October 25, in Phú Quốc Islands, Kiên Giang. The other two sub-contests, Swimsuit competition and the preliminary round, was also set for Phú Quốc on October 17 and 23, while another sub-event, the national costume competition, was scheduled to take place in Quảng Bình on October 12.

The press conference was officially arranged later in April 2017 at the Pan Pacific Hanoi Hotel in Hanoi, where the additional pageant schedule was revealed. In addition to the president of Miss Grand International, Nawat Itsaragrisil, the event also featured the presence of Trần Minh Tiến, chairman and CEO of Lasta Multimedia and Let's Viet TV channel, who was the contest's chief organizer, as well as Ariska Putri Pertiwi, Miss Grand International 2016, and all four runners-up.

=== Selection of participants ===
Contestants from 77 countries and territories have been selected to compete in the competition. Twenty-five of these delegates were determined through the national pageant, thirteen were appointed to their positions after being runner-ups in their national pageant, and the remaining thirty-nine delegates were appointed to the title without participating in any national pageants, such as the representative of Hong Kong.

The original representatives of Canada, Cuba, Denmark, Ecuador, Ethiopia, Hungary, Myanmar, and Venezuela resigned or were dethroned for different reasons, and were replaced by the newly elected representatives. Meanwhile, the representatives of Albania, Iran, Ireland, Kosovo, Namibia, Singapore, and Trinidad and Tobago, did not enter the international tournament for unknown reasons.

== Results ==
=== Placements ===
Placement	Contestant
Miss Grand International 2017	Peru – María José Lora
1st Runner-Up	Venezuela – Tulia Alemán
2nd Runner-Up	Philippines – Elizabeth Clenci
3rd Runner-Up	Puerto Rico – Brenda Jiménez
4th Runner-Up	Czech Republic – Nikola Uhlířová
Top 10	Indonesia – Dea Rizkita §; South Sudan – Eyga Mojus; Thailand – Pamela Pasinetti; Ukraine – Snizhana Tanchuk; Vietnam – Nguyễn Trần Huyền My
Top 20	Australia – Kassandra Kashian; Brazil – Caroline Venturini; China – Xuejiao Chen; Costa Rica – Amalia Matamoros; India – Anukriti Gusain; Laos – Chinnally Nolasing; Mexico – Yoana Gutiérrez; Netherlands – Kelly van den Dungen; Paraguay – Lia Ashmore; Russia – Svetlana Khokhlova

§ – Voted into the Top 10 by viewers and awarded as Miss Popular Vote

=== Special awards ===
Award	Contestant
Best National Costume	Indonesia – Dea Rizkita
Best Evening Gown	China – Xuejiao Chen
Best in Swimsuit	Costa Rica – Amalia Matamoros
Best in Social Media	Paraguay – Leah Ashmore
Miss Popular Vote	Indonesia – Dea Rizkita

== Pageant ==
=== Format ===
In the grand final round on October 25, after an introduction section, twenty-one contestants, who were selected through the preliminary round held on October 23 as well as all pre-pageant scorings, qualified for the quarterfinal round, in which each of the qualified candidates competed in the swimsuit. The score from the quarterfinals, as well as all previous accumulation scores, determined the nine semifinal finalists, together with the winner of the Miss Popular vote, which was elected through public voting, completed the top ten.

The ten finalists competed against each other in the evening gown and speech session, then the final five were selected to continue in the question and answer portion, in which the winner and all four runners-up were determined.

The panel of judges in the grand final round, including:

- Nawat Itsaragrisil – President of Miss Grand International
- Teresa Chaivisut – Vice president of Miss Grand International
- Janelee Chaparro – Miss Grand International 2013
- Daryanne Lees – Miss Grand International 2014
- Claire Elizabeth Parker – Miss Grand International 2015
- Ariska Putri Pertiwi – Miss Grand International 2016
- Lê Sĩ Hoàng – Vietnamese fashion designer

== Contestants ==
77 contestants competed for the title.

Country/Territory	Delegate	Age	Hometown
Argentina	Yoana Don	26	Santiago del Estero
Australia	Kassandra Kashian	22	Sydney
Bahamas	Rejean Bosh	21	Harbour Island
Belarus	Panova Denisovna	19	Minsk
Belgium	Rachel Nimegeers	21	Antwerp
Bolivia	Mariem Suárez	21	Santa Cruz de la Sierra
Brazil	Caroline Venturini	22	Tramandaí
Bulgaria	Ralitsa Kandova	21	Sofía
Cambodia	Khloem Sreykea	18	Phnom Penh
Canada	Natalie Allin	24	Kelowna
Chile	Nicole Ebner	26	La Florida
China	Xuejiao Chen	26	Shanghai
Colombia	Francy Castaño †	23	Santander de Quilichao
Costa Rica	Amalia Matamoros	27	Naranjo
Cuba	Lisandra Delgado	27	Havana
Czech Republic	Nikola Uhlířová	19	Baška
Denmark	Iben Haahr Berner	23	Gudbjerg
Dominican Republic	Surahai Reyes	21	Santo Domingo
Ecuador	Analía Vernaza	23	Quito
Egypt	Merna Ayman Hosny	25	Cairo
England	Noky Simbani	19	Derby
Estonia	Susanna Lehtsalu	24	Tallinn
Ethiopia	Selamawit Teklay	22	Mekele
Fiji	Nadine Roberts	22	Sydney
Finland	Eveliina Tikka	22	Kokkola
France	Sonia Aït Mansour	24	Paris
Germany	Juliane Rohlmann	26	Berlín
Guadeloupe	Krystel Landry	24	Les Abymes
Guatemala	Alejandra Castro	25	Guatemala City
Haiti	Jennifer Alexis	24	Port-au-Prince
Hong Kong	Hoi Lam Law	25	Hong Kong
Hungary	Dalma Kármán	22	Tápióbicske
India	Anukriti Gusain	22	Lansdowne
Indonesia	Dea Rizkita	24	Bandung
Jamaica	Jenaae Jackson	27	Kingston
Japan	Erika Tsuji	27	Kioto
Laos	Chinnaly Nolasing	18	Sisattanak
Lebanon	Christine Houry	25	Beirut
Lithuania	Irmina Preišegalavičiūtė	20	Panevėžys
Macau	Kayii Lei	24	Macau
Malaysia	Sanjeda John	25	Kota Kinabalu
Mexico	Yoana Gutiérrez	23	San Miguel el Alto
Mongolia	Anujin Sugirjav	20	Ulaanbaatar
Myanmar	Aye Chan Moe	24	Yangon
Nepal	Zeenus Lama	25	Kathmandu
Netherlands	Kelly van den Dungen	23	Amsterdam
New Zealand	Meghan Kenney	22	Auckland
Nicaragua	Martha Meza	25	Estelí
Nigeria	Princess Omowunmi Agunbiade	21	Port Harcourt
Northern Ireland	Chloe Davies	20	Derry
Panama	Andrea María Torres	23	Penonomé
Paraguay	Leah Ashmore	22	Villarrica
Peru	María José Lora	27	Trujillo
Philippines	Elizabeth Clenci	26	Mandaue
Portugal	Diana Sofía Santos	21	Porto
Puerto Rico	Brenda Jiménez	27	Aguadilla
Russia	Svetlana Khokhlova	22	Kostroma
Scotland	Amy Meisak	24	Hamilton
Serbia	Maja Smiljković	24	Niš
Sierra Leone	Nyallay Sia Kamara	23	Freetown
Slovakia	Klaudia Kurucz	24	Kráľovičove Kračany
South Africa	Yajna Debideen	23	Durban
South Korea	Ha Young-park	25	Seoul
South Sudan	Eyga Mojus	26	Juba
Spain	Mariana Rico	17	Málaga
Sri Lanka	Visna Fernando	26	Negombo
Sweden	Maja Westlin	19	Örnsköldsvik
Tanzania	Batuli Mohamed	20	Dodoma
Tatarstan	Aigul Zaripova	26	Kazan
Thailand	Pamela Pasinetti	24	Phuket
Uganda	Priscilla Achieng	24	Tororo
Ukraine	Snizhana Tanchuk	26	Lviv
United States	Taylor Kessler	21	Houston
United States Virgin Islands	Brianna Key	26	Texas City
Venezuela	Tulia Alemán	24	Mene de Mauroa
Vietnam	Nguyễn Trần Huyền My	22	Hanoi
Wales	Nadia Suliman	24	Llanelli
