= Miss Grand Costa Rica =

National beauty pageant in Costa Rica

- Established: 7 July 2022; 4 years ago
- Founder: Erick Solis
- Type: Beauty pageant
- Headquarters: San José
- Location: Costa Rica
- Members: Miss Grand International
- Official language: Spanish
- President: Adriano Nuñez (2025)
- Parent organization: Adriano Models C.R. (2025)

Miss Grand Costa Rica
licensees timeline

Stand-alone pageant
Under another pageant
Appointed titleholder
No licensee/titleholder

Miss Grand Costa Rica is a San José-based female national beauty pageant in Costa Rica, organized separately for in first time in 2022 by the Concurso Nacional de Belleza de Costa Rica (CNB Costa Rica), with Erick Solis as the president. The winner of the contest represents the country at its parent competition, the Miss Grand International pageant. Before 2022, the competition license belonged to different organizers, such as the Reinas de Costa Rica organization (2015 – 2017) and the Miss Costa Rica organization (2018 – 2021). Most of the country's representatives at the Miss Grand International pageant during such a period were appointed without organizing the respective pageant.

Since its first participation at Miss Grand International in 2014, Costa Rica has never won the contest but has a record of five placements, including the top 10 finalists in 2015 and 2021, and the top 20 finalists in 2017, 2018, and 2019.

== History ==
Costa Rica has joined the Miss Grand International pageant annually since 2014. However, most of its representatives were appointed to participate without organizing the national contest. In 2020, two years after taking over the franchise from the Reinas de Costa Rica organization, the organizer team related to the Miss Costa Rica organization, led by Gerson Jiménez, ran the pageant reality show "The Finalists," which was aired on Telenovela, to determine country representatives for Miss Grand International, Top Model of the World, Miss Asia Pacific International, and Miss International. The pageant delegates were chosen through regional casting in various locations throughout the country, including Guanacaste, Limón, Alajuela, and San José, with Gabriela Jara Cordero of Limón being chosen as the country representative for the Miss Grand International 2020 pageant, outperforming the other 13 national aspirants.

Previously, the franchise belonged to Olais Antonio Padilla and the Reinas de Costa Rica organization in 2014 and 2015 - 2017, respectively. Padilla planned to organize the first Miss Grand Costa Rica contest the following year after sending a delegate to the Miss Grand International 2014 but lost the franchise to the Reinas de Costa Rica organization before completing such a willingness.

In 2022, after four consecutive years of serving as the national licensee, Jiménez lost the franchise to the organization chaired by Erick Solis, Concurso Nacional de Belleza de Costa Rica (CNB Costa Rica), which conducted the inaugural edition of Miss Grand Costa Rica that year. The contest was held at the Eugene O'Neill Theatre in San José, featuring 12 national finalists, who were directly chosen to compete by the central organizer through online screening, of whom a 28-year-old girl from Guanacaste, Brenda Muñoz, was named the winner. In 2025, the license was obtained by Adriano Núñez from the Adriano Models agency.

Costa Rica has five placements in the Miss Grand International pageant, including the top 10 finalists in 2015 and 2021, and the top 20 finalists in 2017, 2018, and 2019.

== Editions ==
The following list is the edition detail of the Miss Grand Costa Rica contest, since its inception in 2022.

=== Date and venue ===
Edition	Date	Final venue	Host province	Entrants	Ref.
1st	7 July 2022	Eugene O'Neill Theatre, San José	San José	12	
2nd	28 August 2025	Auditorio Nacional Museo de los Niños	San José	25	
3rd	12 August 2026	Auditorio Nacional Museo de los Niños	San José	14	

=== Competition result ===
Year	Edition	Winner	1st runner-up	2nd runner-up	Ref.
2022	1st	Guanacaste – Brenda Muñoz	Puerto Viejo – Maria Alejandra	San Isidro de El General – Iabella Oldenburg	
2025	2nd	Heredia – Kristel Gómez	San José – Aylin Montero	Puntarenas – Karla Sequeira	
2026	3rd	Heredia – Catalina Murillo	San José – Noribel Arce	Guanacaste – Eimy Jiménez	

== Representatives at Miss Grand International ==
Color keys

- Declared as winner.
- Ended as a runner-up (Top 5).
- Ended as a semi-finalist (Top 10).
- Ended as a quarterfinalist (Top 20).
- Unplaced.

List of Costa Rican representatives at Miss Grand International
Year	Representative	National qualification	International result		National director	Ref.
Year	Representative	National qualification	Placements	Other awards	National director	Ref.
2014	Anniel Quesada	Appointment	Unplaced	—N/a	Olais Antonio Padilla	
2015	Mariela Aparicio	Appointment	Top 10	Best in Swimsuit	Alan Aleman	
2016	Monique Rodriguez	4th runner-up Miss Universe Costa Rica 2013	Unplaced	—N/a	Alan Aleman	
2017	Amalia Matamoros	Miss World Costa Rica 2008	Top 20	Best in Swimsuit	Alan Aleman	
2018	Nicole Menayo	2nd runner-up Miss Grand Spain 2018	Top 20	—N/a	Gerson Jiménez	
2019	Brenda Castro	Miss Costa Rica 2015	Top 20	—N/a	Gerson Jiménez	
2020	Gabriela Jara	The Finalists 2020	Unplaced	—N/a	Gerson Jiménez	
2021	Adriana Moya	Appointment	Top 10	—N/a	Gerson Jiménez	
2022	Brenda Muñoz	Miss Grand Costa Rica 2022	Unplaced	—N/a	Erick Solis	
2023	Kristell Freeman	1st runner-up Miss Costa Rica 2022	Unplaced	—N/a	Erick Solis	
2024	Macarena Chamberlain	Appointment	Withdrew		Erick Solis	
2025	Kristel Gómez	Miss Grand Costa Rica 2025	Unplaced	—N/a	Adriano Nuñez	
2026	Catalina Murillo	Miss Grand Costa Rica 2026	Top 25	—N/a	Adriano Nuñez	

== Gallery ==
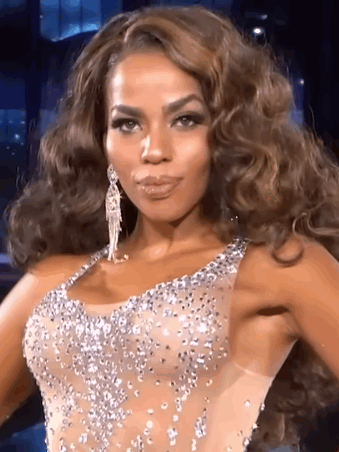
Miss Grand Costa Rica 2025
Kristel Gómez

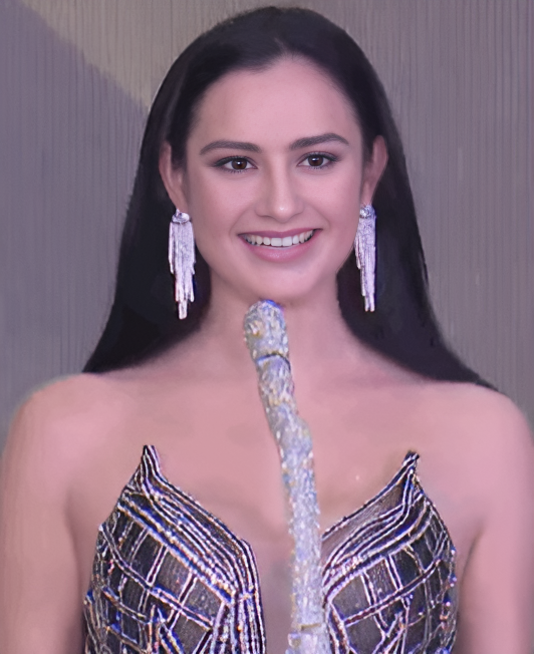
Miss Grand Costa Rica 2024
Macarena Chamberlain

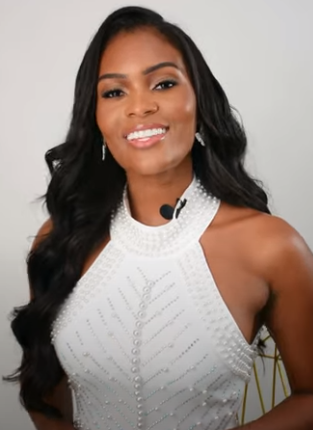
Miss Grand Costa Rica 2023
Kristell Freeman

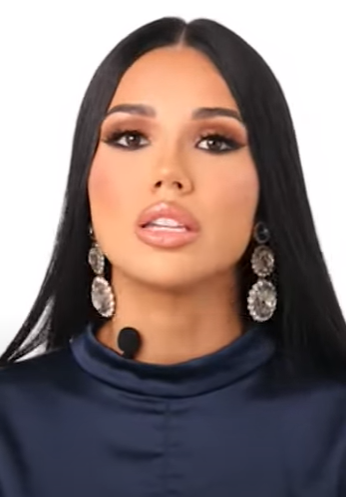
Miss Grand Costa Rica 2022
Brenda Muñoz

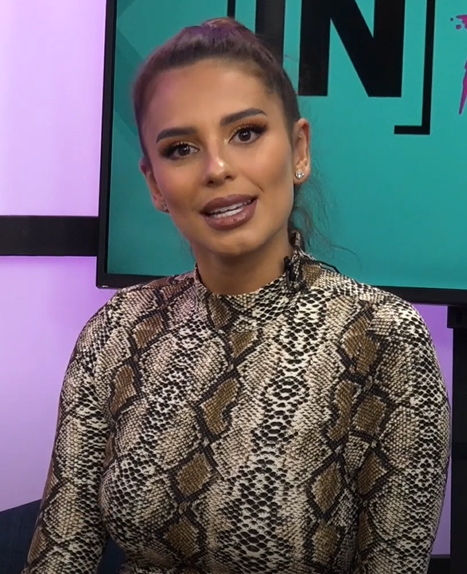
Miss Grand Costa Rica 2021
Adriana Moya

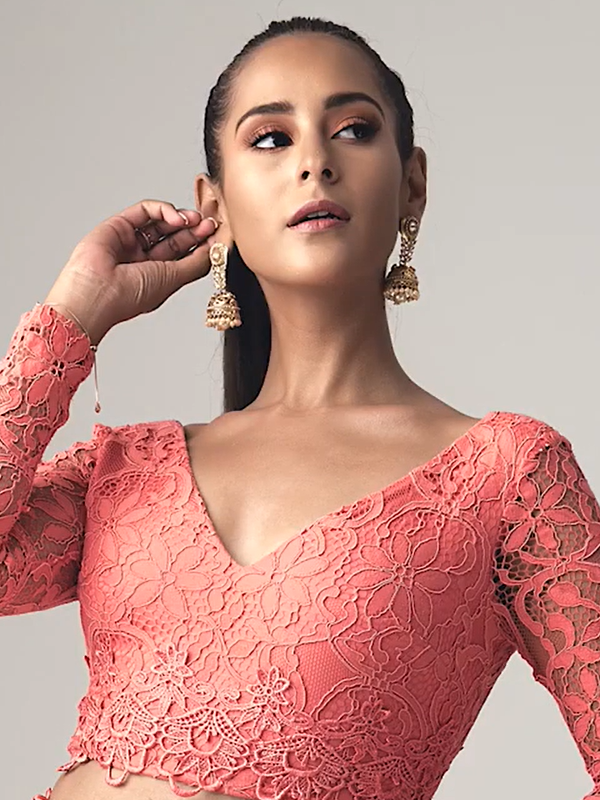
Miss Grand Costa Rica 2020
Gabriela Jara

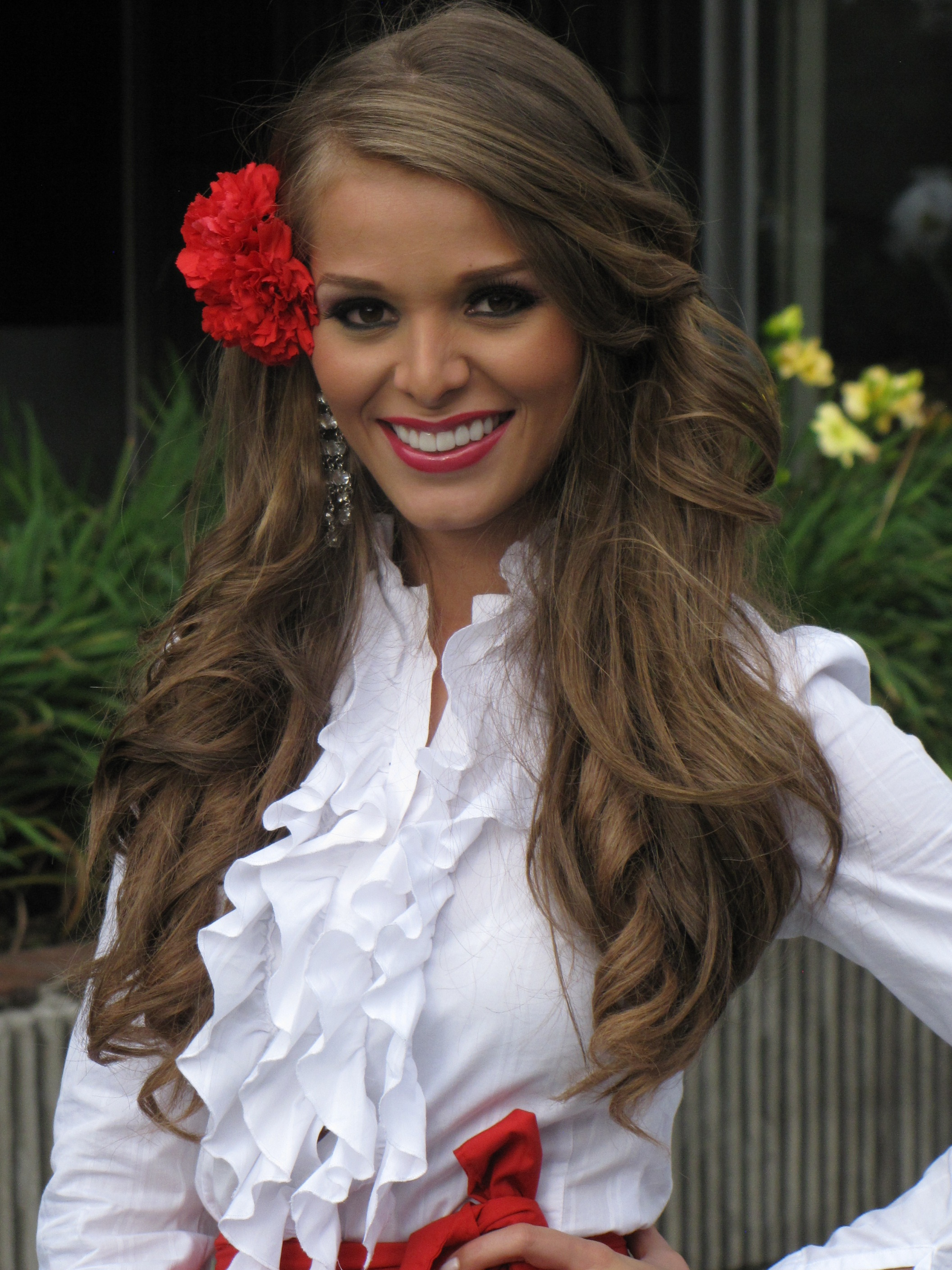
Miss Grand Costa Rica 2017
Amalia Matamoros

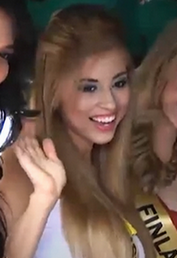
Miss Grand Costa Rica 2014
Anniel Quesada

== Annual editions ==
=== Miss Grand Costa Rica 2025 ===
Miss Grand Costa Rica
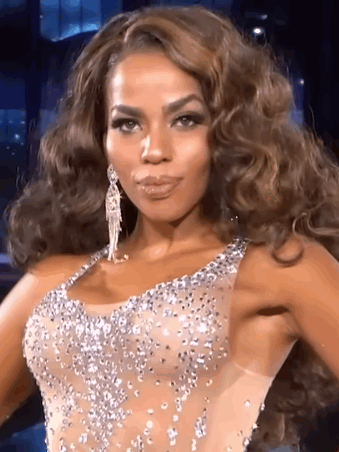
- Kristel Gómez, the winner of the contest
- Date: 28 August 2025
- Presenters: Adriana Víquez; Bray Vargas
- Venue: Auditorio Nacional Museo de los Niños, San José, Costa Rica
- Broadcaster: Fashion Life & Style Latinoamérica; YouTube
- Entrants: 25
- Placements: 16
- Winner: Kristel Gómez (Heredia)

External videos
- Miss Grand Costa Rica 2025 Finals
- 2025 Miss Grand Costa Rica Finals by Adriano Models

Miss Grand Costa Rica 2025 was the 2nd edition of Miss Grand Costa Rica pageant, held on 28 August 2025, at the Auditorio Nacional Museo de los Niños, San José, Costa Rica. Twenty-five contestants from all 7 provinces of Costa Rica competed for the title.

The contest was won by a 31-year-old Kristel Gómez, representing the Heredia Province. Kristel later represented the country at the Miss Grand International 2025 pageant, held in Thailand on 16 October 2025, but was unplaced.

The event was hosted by a Costa Rican television personality Adriana Víquez and a Dominican politician and internet personality Bray Vargas.

==== Results ====
Position	Delegate
Miss Grand Costa Rica 2025	Heredia III – Kristel Gómez
Miss Latinoamercia Costa Rica 2025	Heredia V – Luzmery Rodriguez (Note: Awarded in the preliminary round)
1st runner-up	San José II – Aylin Montero
2nd runner-up	Puntarenas II – Karla Sequeira
3rd runner-up	Heredia I – Ana Carolina Artavia
4th runner-up	Cartago IV – Jimena Zuñiga Herrera
5th runner-up	Guanacaste IV – Kendra Valeska Villalobos
Top 16	Alajuela I – Marisol; Guanacaste I – Malu Fajardo; Guanacaste II – Sugey Obando; Guanacaste III – Gabriella Reyes; Heredia IV – Joheysi Lopez; Limón I – Ritchelle Avendaño; Limón III – Ashley Hernandez; Limón IV – Shanill Veach; Puntarenas III– Tatiana Vallejos Rojas
Special awards
Best Body	Puntarenas II – Karla Sequeira
Best Talent	Guanacaste III – Gabriella
Miss Elegance	Cartago II – Monserrath Jiménez

==== Candidates ====
1. Limón I – Ritchelle Avendaño
2. Heredia I – Ana Carolina Artavia
3. Alajuela I – Marisol
4. Cartago I – Dixiana Burgos
5. San José I – Melany Bedoya
6. Heredia II – Ashley Campos
7. Guanacaste I – Malu Fajardo
8. Limón II – Candy Gaitan
9. Heredia III – Kristel Gómez
10. Limón III – Ashley Hernandez
11. Cartago II – Monserrath Jiménez
12. Heredia IV – Joheysi Lopez
13. Cartago III – Mariana Marín Castro
14. Alajuela II – Kristel Mongee
15. San José II – Aylin Montero
16. Guanacaste II – Sugey Obando
17. Puntarenas I – Kiara Ramirez Garro
18. Guanacaste III – Gabriella Reyes
19. Heredia V – Luzmery Rodriguez
20. Puntarenas II – Karla Sequeira
21. San José III – Sofi Solano
22. Puntarenas III– Tatiana Vallejos Rojas
23. Limón IV – Shanill Veach
24. Guanacaste IV – Kendra Valeska Villalobos
25. Cartago IV – Jimena Zuñiga Herrera

=== Miss Grand Costa Rica 2026 ===
Miss Grand Costa Rica
- Date: 12 August 2026
- Presenters: Jesse Del Valle; Melania Villalta
- Venue: Auditorio Nacional Museo de los Niños, San José, Costa Rica
- Entrants: 14
- Placements: 10
- Winner: Catalina Murillo, Heredia

External videos
- Miss Grand Costa Rica 2026 Finals
- 2026 Miss Grand Costa Rica Top 10, Top 6, and Top 3 Announcement

Miss Grand Costa Rica 2026 was the 3rd edition of the Miss Grand Costa Rica pageant, held on 12 August 2026 at the Auditorio Nacional Museo de los Niños in San José, Costa Rica. Fourteen contestants representing all seven provinces of Costa Rica competed for the title.

At the end of the event, Catalina Murillo of Heredia was named the winner and was crowned by the outgoing titleholder, Kristel Gómez, Miss Grand Costa Rica 2025. Murillo will represent the country at Miss Grand International 2026, to be held in India in October 2026.

The grand final was hosted by Melania Villalta, a Costa Rican candidate at MGI All Stars 1st Edition, and Jesse del Valle, a model from Mexico.

==== Results ====
Position		Delegate
Miss Grand Costa Rica 2026		Heredia – Catalina Murillo
1st runner-up		San José – Noribel Arce
2nd runner-up		Guanacaste – Eimy Jiménez
Top 6	3rd runner-up	San José – Margaret Gray
Top 6	4th runner-up	Limón – Gabriela Aguilar
Top 6	5th runner-up	Alajuela – Mariela Aguirre
Top 10		Cartago – Priscilla Fonseca; Guanacaste – Sheryll Sandoval; Puntarenas – Evaluna Delgado; San José – Samantha Olivier

==== Contestants ====
Fifteen contestants were initially confirmed, but one of Cartago's candidates, Emily Moraga, later withdrew, leaving fourteen in the final lineup.

Province	Representatives	Province	Representative(s)
Alajuela	Amanda Quirós; Mariela Aguirre; Nataly Hervoso	Heredia	Catalina Murillo; Karol Campos
Alajuela	Amanda Quirós; Mariela Aguirre; Nataly Hervoso	Limón	Gabriela Aguilar
Cartago	Paula Hernández; Priscilla Fonseca	Puntarenas	Evaluna Delgado
Cartago	Paula Hernández; Priscilla Fonseca	San José	Margaret Gray; Noribel Arce; Samantha Olivier
Guanacaste	Eimy Jiménez; Sheryll Sandoval	San José	Margaret Gray; Noribel Arce; Samantha Olivier

Withdrawals

- Cartago – Emily Moraga
