= Miss Grand Tatarstan =

Russian beauty pageant title

- Formation: 2017
- Type: Beauty pageant
- Headquarters: Cheboksary
- Location: Russia
- Members: Miss Grand International
- Official language: Russian
- National director: Vladimir Ilyin
- Parent organization: Volga Models (2018 – 2019)

Miss Grand Tatarstan is a female beauty pageant title awarded to Tatar representatives competing in the Miss Grand International contest. From 2017 to 2018, the franchise of Miss Grand International for Tatarstan belonged to the Miss Tourism Russia pageant, which is organized by a Cheboksary-based modeling agency headed by Vladimir Ilyin, Volga Models.

The first Tatar at Miss Grand International was a Khabarovsk-based model, Aigul Zaripova, assigned in 2017; however, Aigul didn't place at the Miss Grand International 2017 semifinals held in Vietnam. Later in 2018, the winner of Miss Tourism Russia 2017, Zulfiya Sharafeeva, was assigned by the mentioned organizer to partake in the 2018 edition of Miss Grand International in Myanmar, but Zulfiya also was unplaced. Zulfiya was the last Tatar representative to compete in Miss Grand International.

== International competition ==
The following is a list of Tatar representatives at the Miss Grand International contest.

Year	Representative	Original national title	Result	National director
2017	Aigul Zaripova Айгуль Зарипова	Miss Tatarstan 2013 Finalist	Unplaced	Vladimir Ilyin
2018	Zulfiya Sharafeeva Зульфия Шарафеева	Miss Tourism Russia 2017	Unplaced	Vladimir Ilyin
No representatives since 2019
