= Miss Grand Argentina 2025 =

1st Miss Grand Argentina competition

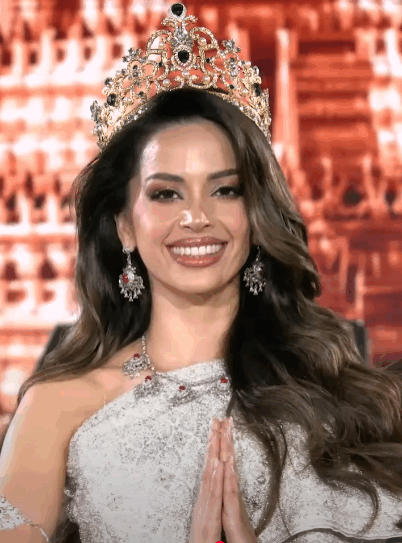
- Elena Mateo, the winner of the contest
- Date: 27 August 2025
- Venue: Teatro Ateneo Cecilia Bernasconi, Buenos Aires
- Entrants: 12
- Placements: 7
- Debuts: Antártida; Buenos Aires; Cataratas (MN); Ciudad Autónoma de Buenos Aires; Corrientes; Jujuy; Islas del Atlántico Sur (TF); Misiones; Noroeste; Salta; Selva Misionera (MN); Tucumán
- Winner: Elena Mateo (Tucumán)

Miss Grand Argentina 2025 competition results by province
Color key:
| Winner | 1st runner-up |
| 2nd runner-up | 3rd runner-up |
| 4th runner-up | Top 7 |
| Unplaced | No representative |

Miss Grand Argentina 2025 was the first edition of the Miss Grand Argentina pageant, held on 27 August 2025 at the Teatro Ateneo Cecilia Bernasconi in Buenos Aires. Twelve contestants from different provinces and departments of the country competed for the title.

The contest was won by a 22-year-old Elena Mateo, representing the Tucumán Province. Mateo will later represent the country on the parent stage of Miss Grand International 2025, which will take place in Bangkok, Thailand, on 18 October 2025.

The pageant was organized under the directorship of an entrepreneur, Malena Gonzalez, who is also the director of Miss Supranational for Argentina.

== Selection of contestants ==
The contestants for this inaugural edition were determined by either the central organizer or the regional coordinators through local pageants or by directly hand-picking.

The following is a list of regional pageants for Miss Grand Argentina 2025, by the coronation date.

| Pageant | Edition | Date & Venue | Entrants | Coordinator | Ref. |
|---|---|---|---|---|---|
| Miss Grand Salta | 1st | 29 June 2025 at the Hotel Salta, Buenos Aires | 13 | Nahuel Tesino | |
| Miss Grand Islas del Atlántico Sur | 1st | 5 July 2025 at the Teatro Usina Cultural, Salta | 10 | Ivonne Lizarraga | |
| Miss Grand Jujuy | 1st | 20 July 2025 at the Centro Cultural Éxodo Jujeño, Jujuy | 16 | Lea Sanchez | |

== Results ==
| Placement | Contestant |
|---|---|
| Winner | Tucumán – Elena Mateo |
| 1st runner-up | Corrientes – Selene Bublitz |
| 2nd runner-up | Buenos Aires – Caro Elsegood |
| 3rd runner-up | Islas del Atlántico Sur – Julieta Pérez Castellanos |
| 4th runner-up | Cataratas – Luisina Sendra |
| Top 7 | Noroeste – Raquel Dietz; Salta – Mayra Sarmiento |

== Contestants ==
The following contestants have been confirmed.

- Antártida – Candela Araceli Staudenmaier
- Buenos Aires – Caro Elsegood
- Cataratas – Luisina Sendra
- Ciudad Autónoma de Buenos Aires – Sofia Bedas
- Corrientes – Selene Bublitz
- Islas del Atlántico Sur – Julieta Pérez Castellanos
- Jujuy – Oriana Montañez
- Misiones – Sheila Davalos
- Noroeste – Raquel Dietz
- Salta – Mayra Sarmiento
- Selva Misionera – Daal Alejandra Maidana
- Tucumán – Elena Mateo
