= Huyền My =

Vietnamese model and beauty pageant titleholder

Nguyễn Trần Huyền My
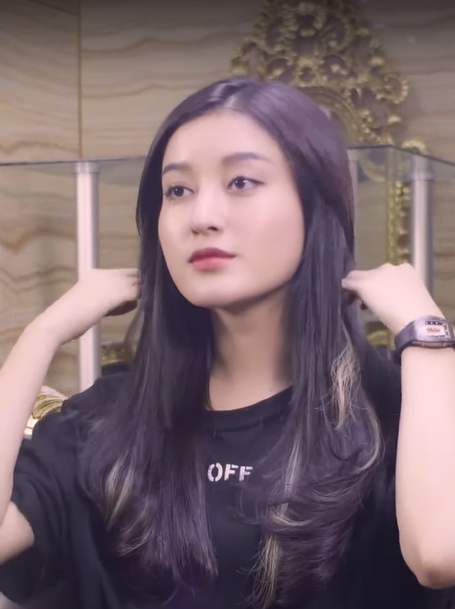
- Born: December 11, 1995 (age 30); Hà Nội, Vietnam
- Education: London College For Design and Fashion
- Height: 1.74 m (5 ft 9 in)
- Beauty pageant titleholder
- Title: Miss Grand Vietnam 2017; 1st Runner-Up Miss Vietnam 2014
- Hair color: Black
- Eye color: Black
- Major competitions: Miss Vietnam 2014 (1st Runner-Up); Miss Grand International 2017 (Top 10)

Signature
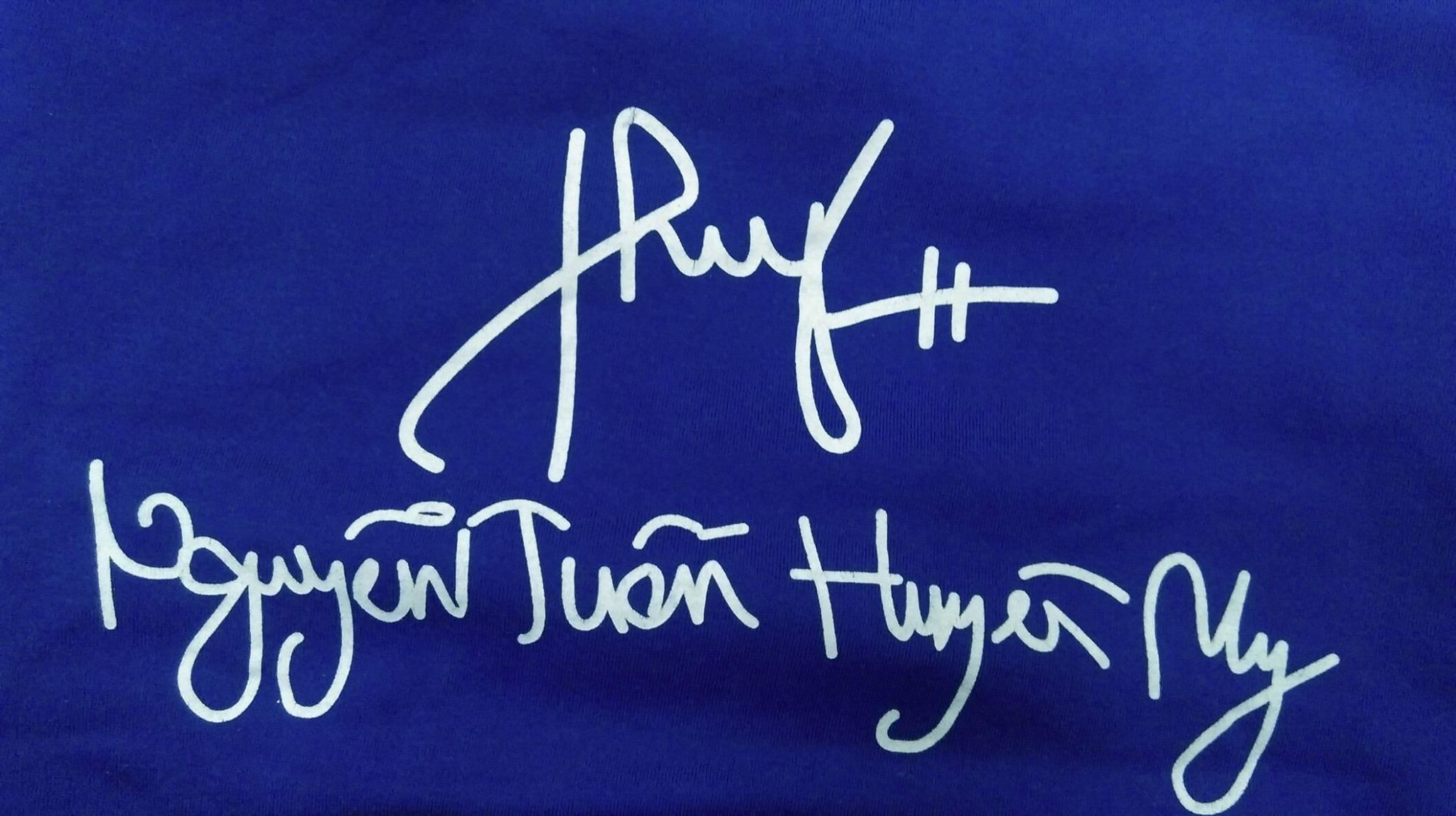

Nguyễn Trần Huyền My is a Vietnamese model and beauty pageant titleholder. She was the 1st Runner-Up of the Miss Vietnam 2014, Miss Grand Vietnam 2017 and finished as a Top 10 semifinalist at Miss Grand International 2017.

== Pageantry ==
=== Miss Vietnam 2014 ===
She participated in a beauty contest for the first time and won 1st Runner-up at Miss Vietnam 2014.

=== Miss Grand International 2017 ===
As Miss Grand Vietnam 2017, she represented Vietnam at Miss Grand International 2017 held in Vietnam. In the grand final, she placed as Top 10.

Awards and achievements
Preceded by Dương Tú Anh	Miss Vietnam 1st Runner Up; 2014	Succeeded by Ngô Thanh Thanh Tú
Preceded by Nguyễn Thị Loan	Miss Grand Vietnam; 2017	Succeeded by Bùi Phương Nga
