= Amalia Matamoros =

Costa Rican beauty queen

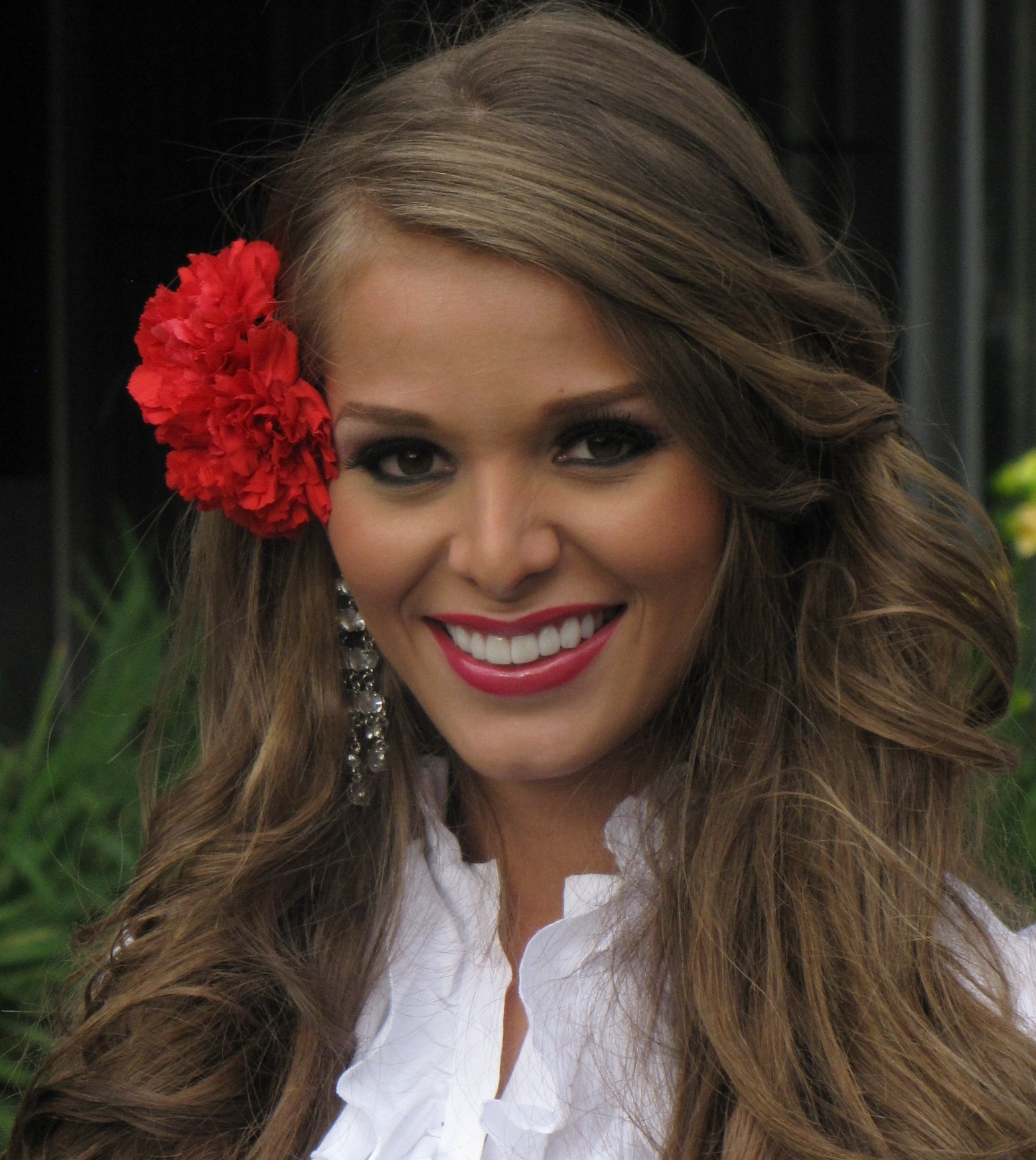
- Born: María Amalia Matamoros Solís; June 17, 1989 (age 37); Grecia, Costa Rica
- Height: 1.79 m (5 ft 10 in)
- Beauty pageant titleholder
- Title: Miss Teen Expoworld 2007; Miss World Costa Rica 2008; Miss Panamerican International 2014; Miss Grand Costa Rica 2017
- Major competitions: Miss World Costa Rica 2008 (Winner); Miss World 2008 (Unplaced); Miss International 2011 (Unplaced); Miss Universe Costa Rica 2014 (4th Runner-up); Miss Panamerican International 2014 (Winner); Miss Universe Costa Rica 2016 (3rd Runner-up); Miss Intercontinental 2016 (Top 15); Miss Grand International 2017 (Top 20)

María Amalia Matamoros Solís is a Costa Rican model and beauty pageant titleholder who was best known for her title Miss Grand Costa Rica 2017. She went on to represent her country in Miss Grand International 2017 in Vietnam, placed in Top 20 and won Best in Swimsuit Award. She also represented Costa Rica previously in many International contest such as Miss World 2008, Miss International 2011 and many more.

== Pageantry ==
She began her career in 2007 when she won the Miss Teen ExpoWorld pageant. She has also competed in Miss Latin America 2008, where she was a top 12 finalist.

In same year 2008, she entered in her first national pageant, Reinas de Costa Rica, she won the crown in the end. As a winner of the contest, she represented Costa Rica in Miss World 2008, but went Unplaced. She later represented Costa Rica in many international contest such as Miss Tourism Queen International 2008, Miss Continents Americano 2009, Reina Hispanoamericana 2009, International Coffee Queen 2011, Miss Bikini International 2011 and Miss International 2011, unfortunately in none of these pageants she placed.

After years of absence from beauty contests, she took part in the Miss Costa Rica 2014 pageant, where she represented Alajuela Province. She finished in the top five and won the special prize Reto Saba Multi Estilo. She participated in the Miss Panamerican International 2014 and won the crown, it is the first crown for Costa Rica. She competed again in Miss Costa Rica, in 2016 edition, where she stood 4th overall.

In 2016, She represented Costa Rica in Miss Intercontinental pageant and successfully placed in Top 15 finalists and sashed Best Body in the said contest.

=== Miss Grand International 2017 ===
In October 2017, she was the representative of Costa Rica in Miss Grand International 2017, held at the Vinpearl Convention Center in Phú Quốc Island, Vietnam. On October 12, she caused a sensation during the national costume competition with an outfit inspired by traditional Boruca masks that featured a feathered wooden headdress entirely hand-carved by the Boruca, although it was so huge that it slipped off her head during her performance. During the evening gown competition held on October 23, she unintentionally garnered the attention of the media because of her fall on stage after she tripped on the hem of her long dress. She ultimately placed in the Top 20 and won the "Best in Swimsuit" prize.

Preceded by Wendy Cordero	Reinas de Costa Rica; 2008	Succeeded by Alejandra Álvarez
