= Miss Teen International 2007 =

Beauty pageant edition

Miss Teen International 2007 took place on November 25, 2007, in Costa Rica. About 20 - 30 delegates largely from Latin America are assumed to have attended that year.

== Contestants ==
Country	Contestant	Age	Height (cm)
Chile	Raquel Calderón	16	175
Dominican Republic	Johanna Astwood	17	178
