= Miss Grand Serbia =

Serbian beauty pageant title

- Formation: 2013
- Type: Beauty pageant
- Headquarters: Belgrade
- Location: Serbia
- Members: Miss Grand International
- Official language: Serbian
- National director: Vesna de Vinča
- Parent organization: Miss Serbia (2013, 2017)

Miss Grand Serbia is a national beauty pageant title awarded to Serbian representatives chosen to compete at the Miss Grand International pageant. It was first awarded in 2013 to Milica Stojsavljević, the winner of Miss Photo Model of Balkan 2013, and the second to Maja Smiljković, a geography student who received the title after participating in the Miss Serbia 2017 contest.

As of 2017, the license of Miss Grand Serbia belonged to the organizer of Miss Serbia pageant, Vesna de Vinča.

Since the establishment of Miss Grand International, Serbia sent its representatives to compete only twice; in 2013 and 2017, both representatives received non-placements.

== History ==
Serbia debuted in Miss Grand International in 2013 by an appointed Milica Stojsavljević, who previously won the 2013 Miss Photo Model of Balkan pageant and was originally set to represent Serbia at Miss Top Model International 2017 in Latvia, but she withdrew due to a lack of financial support, and was later invited to join the first edition of Miss Grand International in Thailand instead. However, due to no Miss Grand Serbia franchise holder caused Serbia to absent in Miss Grand International from 2014 to 2016.

After three consecutive years of absence, Serbia returned to the competition in the 2017 edition in Vietnam. Its representative, Maja Smiljković, was sent by the organizer of Miss Serbia pageant after she finished as the top 6 finalists at the 2017 national contest. Smiljković was the winner of Miss South Serbia 2017, a regional preliminary contest for Miss Serbia.

Due to lacking franchise holders, the Serbian representatives for Miss Grand International have not additionally been elected since 2018.

== International competition ==
The following is a list of Serbian representatives at the Miss Grand International contest.

Year	Representative	Original national title	Competition performance		National director
Year	Representative	Original national title	Placement	Other awards	National director
2013	Milica Stojsavljević	Miss Photo Model of Balkan 2013	Unplaced	—N/a	Vesna de Vinča
No representatives from 2014 to 2016					Vesna de Vinča
2017	Maja Smiljković	Top 6 Miss Serbia 2017	Unplaced	—N/a	
No representatives since 2018
