= Yoana Don =

Argentine glamour model (born 1991)

- Born: January 30, 1991 (age 35); Selva, Santiago del Estero, Argentina
- Height: 1.78 m (5 ft 10 in)
- Beauty pageant titleholder
- Title: Miss World Argentina 2014; Reina Hispanoamericana Argentina 2015; Miss International Argentina 2016; Miss Grand Argentina 2017
- Hair color: Blonde
- Eye color: Dark Honey
- Major competitions: Miss World Argentina 2014 (Winner); Miss World 2014 (Unplaced); Reina Hispanoamericana 2015 (2nd Runner-up); Miss International 2016 (Top 15); Miss Grand International 2017 (Unplaced)

Yoana del Carmen Don (born January 30, 1991) is an Argentine glamour model and beauty pageant titleholder who she represented Argentina at Miss World 2014. Yoana was elected Miss World Argentina at an event held at Centro de Convenciones de City Center Rosario in December 2013. She also represented her country at Miss International 2016 in Tokyo, Japan, where she placed in the Top 15. Don represented Argentina at Miss Grand International 2017 on October 25, 2017 in Vietnam.
