= Bierges =

Sub-municipality of the city of Wavre, Wallonia, Belgium

Bierges Biedje (Walloon)
- Sub-municipality of Wavre
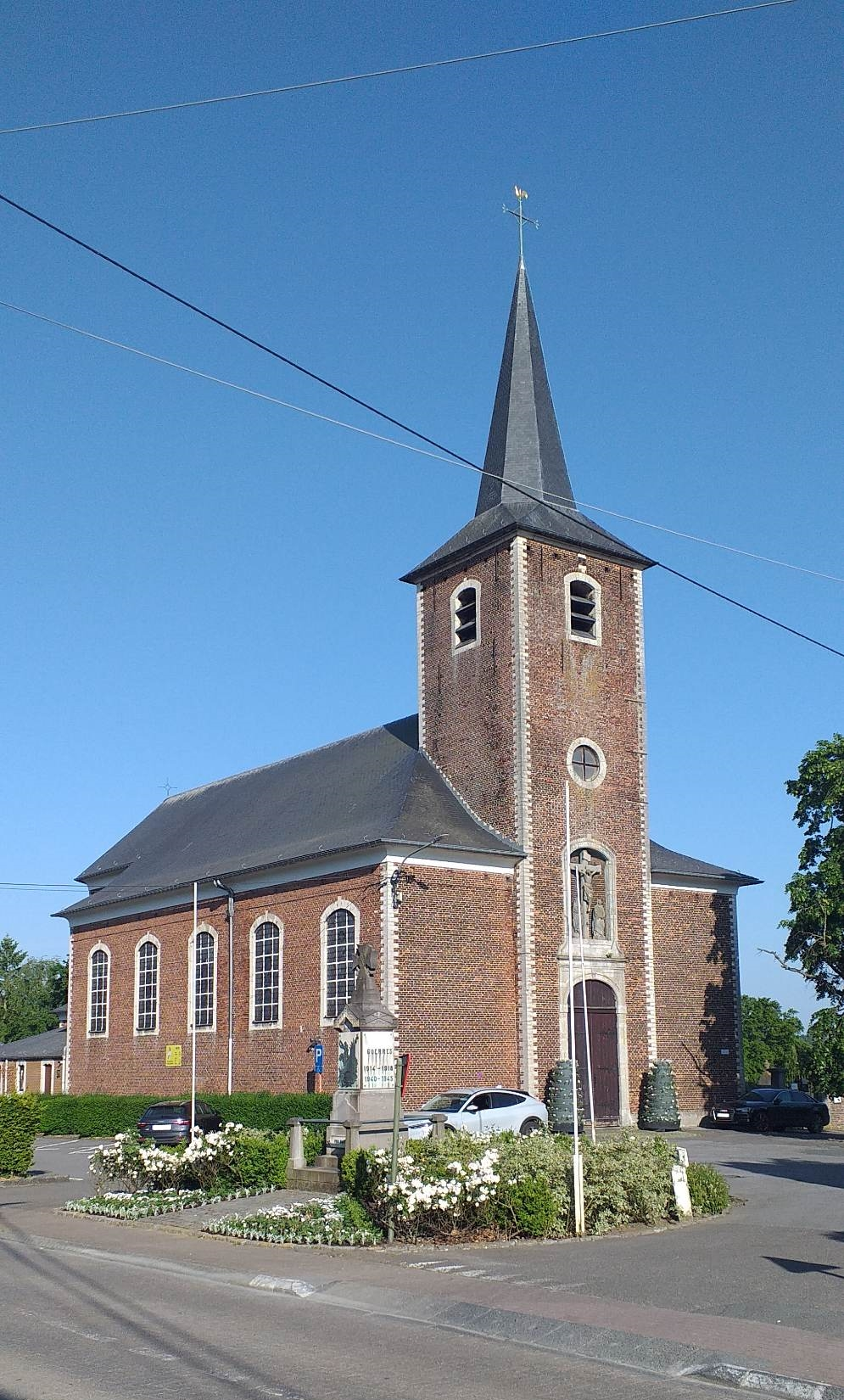
- Church of Saints Marcellinus and Peter
- Interactive map of Bierges
- Location within Belgium Location within Walloon Brabant
- Coordinates: 50°42′00″N 4°35′00″E
- Country: Belgium
- Community: French Community
- Region: Wallonia
- Province: Walloon Brabant
- Arrondissement: Nivelles
- Municipality: Wavre

Area
  - Total: 9.66 km^{2} (3.73 sq mi)

Population (2020-01-01)
  - Total: 5,020
  - Density: 520/km^{2} (1,350/sq mi)
- Postal codes: 1301
- Area codes: 010

Bierges (French pronunciation: [bjɛʁʒ]; Walloon: Biedje) is a sub-municipality of the city of Wavre located in the province of Walloon Brabant, Wallonia, Belgium. It was a separate municipality until 1977. On 1 January 1977, it was merged into Wavre.

== Transport ==
- Bierges-Walibi railway station
