= Belleza Argentina =

Beauty pageant

The Belleza Argentina Miss Mundo Argentina
- Formation: 2004
- Type: Beauty pageant
- Headquarters: Buenos Aires
- Location: Argentina
- Members: Miss World; Miss International; Miss Supranational
- Official language: Spanish
- Organization: N Entertainment
- Key people: Nadia Cerri
- Website: missargentina.tv

The Belleza Argentina (English: Argentine Beauty), also known as "Miss Mundo Argentina", is a national beauty pageant in Argentina to select representatives to the Miss World, Miss International and Miss Supranational.

== History ==
The Belleza Argentina founded in 2004 under motto "Talent, Sport, Culture and Social Responsibility." by Nadia Cerri, N Entertainment and Nadia Cerri Professional make up. The foundation acquired the Miss World, and Miss Supranational licenses since these licenses dropped by another foundation in Argentina.

The Belleza Argentina chosen runs through the provinces of Argentina conducting an awareness campaign for the prevention of trafficking in persons, and participates in various social and cultural events linked to prevention.

Prior to 2004 the Runner-up title holders from Miss Argentina or previous casting winners participated at the Miss World and Miss International beauty pageant. In history; Argentina has officially two Miss World winners in 1960 and 1978 in and one Miss International winner in 1967.

== Titleholders ==
Year	The Belleza Argentina
2004	Veronica Estarriaga
2005	Emilia Iannetta
2006	Beatriz Vallejos
2007	Alejandra Bernal
2008	Agustina Quinteros
2009	Evelyn Lucía Manchón
2010	Mariana Arambarry Mantegazza
2011	Antonella Kruger
2012	Josefina Herrero
2013	Teresa Kuster
2014	Yoana Don
2015	Daniela Mirón
2016	Camila Macias
2017	Avril Marco
2018	Victoria Soto
2019	Judit Grña
2020	Due to the impact of COVID-19 pandemic, no pageant in 2020
2021	Amira Hidalgo
2022	Due to the impact of COVID-19 pandemic, no pageant in 2022
2023	Mariela Fuchs
2024	No competition held
2025	Guadalupe Alomar
2026	Alina Akselrad
2027	TBA

== International pageants ==
Here the Argentine representatives at Miss World, Miss International and Miss Grand International under the Belleza Argentina.

=== Miss World Argentina ===
Color key

- Declared as winner
- Ended as runner-up
- Ended as one of the finalists or semi-finalists

Year	Miss World Argentina	Placement at Miss World
1959	Amalia Yolanda Scuffi	Top 15
1960	Norma Gladys Cappagli	Miss World 1960
1961	Susana Julia Pardal	Top 15
1962	Maria Amalia Ramírez	Top 15
1963	Diana Sarti	Unplaced
1964	Ana Maria Soria	1st Runner up
1965	Lidia Alcira Diaz	Unplaced
1966	Graciela Guardone	Top 15
1967	Maria del Carmen Sabaliuskas	1st Runner up
1968	Viviana Roldan	Top 15
1969	Graciela Marino	Unplaced
1970	Patricia Maria Charré Salazar	Unplaced
1971	Alicia Beatriz Daneri	Unplaced
1972	Olga Edith Cognini Ferrer	Unplaced
1973	Beatriz Callejón	Unplaced
1974	Sara Barberi	Unplaced
1975	Lilian Noemí De Asti	Unplaced
1976	Adriana Laura Salguiero	Top 15
1977	Susana Beatriz Stéfano	Unplaced
1978	Silvana Suárez†	Miss World 1978
1979	Veronica Ivonne Gargani	Unplaced
1980	Elsa Cecilia Galotti	Unplaced
1981	Ana Helen Natali	Top 15
1987	Caterina Ciscato	Top 6
1988	Gabriela Karina Madeira	Unplaced
1989	Patricia Weidenhofer	Unplaced
1990	Romina Rosales	Unplaced
1991	Marcela Noemi Chazarreta	Unplaced
1992	Claudia Andrea Bertona	Unplaced
1993	Viviana Carcereri	Unplaced
1994	Miriam Elizabeth Nahon	Unplaced
1995	María Lorena Jensen	Unplaced
1996	Fernanda Fernández Ramírez	Unplaced
1997	Natalia Pombo	Unplaced
1998	Natalia Elisa González	Unplaced
1999	Veronica Denise Barrionuevo	Unplaced
2000	Daniela Stucan	Unplaced
2001	Virginia di Salvo	Unplaced
2002	Tamara Henriksen	Unplaced
2003	Grisel Hitoff	Unplaced
2004	Veronica Estarriaga	Unplaced
2005	Emilia Iannetta	Unplaced
2006	Beatriz Vallejos	Unplaced
2007	Alejandra Bernal	Unplaced
2008	Agustina Quinteros	Unplaced
2009	Evelyn Lucía Manchón	Unplaced
2010	Mariana Arambarry Mantegazza	Unplaced
2011	Antonella Kruger	Unplaced
2012	Josefina Herrero	Unplaced
2013	Teresa Kuster	Unplaced
2014	Yoana Don	Unplaced
2015	Daniela Mirón	Unplaced
2016	Camila Macias	Unplaced
2017	Avril Marco	Top 40
2018	Victoria Soto	Unplaced
2019	Judit Grnja	Unplaced
2020	Due to the impact of COVID-19 pandemic, no pageant in 2020	
2021	Amira Hidalgo	Top 40
2022	Due to the impact of COVID-19 pandemic, no pageant in 2022	
2023	Mariela Fuchs	Unplaced
2024	No competition held	
2025	Guadalope Alomar	Top 20
2026	Alina Akselrad	Top 22
2027	TBA	TBA

=== Miss International Argentina ===
Color key

- Declared as Winner
- Ended as runner-up
- Ended as one of the finalists or semifinalists

Year	Miss International Argentina	Placement at Miss International
1960	Slaviska Lazarik	Unplaced
1961	Alicia Caré	Unplaced
1962	Maria Victoria Bueno	1st Runner up
1963	Susana Beatriz Cukar	Unplaced
1964	Viviana Rosa Dellavedova	Top 15
1965	Alicia Raquel Arruabarrena	Unplaced
1967	Mirta Massa	Miss International 1967
1968	Ana Inés Puiggrós	Unplaced
1969	Graciela Eva Arevalo	Unplaced
1970	Margarita Marta Briese	1st Runner up
1971	Evelina Scheidl	Top 15
1972	Adriana Graciela Martin	Top 15
1973	Monica Elena Neu	Top 15
1974	Norma Nilda Yamaguchi	Unplaced
1975	Patricia Norma Fracciono	Unplaced
1976	Esther Yolanda Fonsec	Unplaced
1977	Susan Heier	Unplaced
1978	Graciela Riadigos	Unplaced
1979	Ana Maria Soliman	Unplaced
1980	Viviana Teresa Redruello	Unplaced
1983	Patricia Graciela Marisconi Aban	Unplaced
1986	Bárbara Laszyc	Unplaced
1987	Rossana Ranier	Unplaced
1988	Adriana Almada	Unplaced
1989	Marcela Laura Bonesi	Unplaced
1990	Vanessa Mirna Razzore Oyola	Top 12
1991	Veronica Marcela Caldi	Unplaced
1992	Gisella Manida Demarchi	Top 12
1993	Nazarena González Almada	Unplaced
1994	Alicia Andrea Ramon	Unplaced
1995	Lorena Andrea Palacios	Unplaced
1996	María Bordon	Unplaced
1997	Nadia Jimena Cerri	Unplaced
1998	Maria Fernandez Ortiz	Unplaced
1999	Elizabeth Contrard	Unplaced
2000	Natalia Cecilia Dalla Costa	Unplaced
2001	Maria Victoria Branda	Unplaced
2003	Catalina Roullier	Unplaced
2007	Paula Quiroga	Unplaced
2008	Yesica Di Vincenzo	Unplaced
2009	María Mercedes Viaña	Unplaced
2012	Daiana Incandela	Unplaced
2014	Josefina Herrero	Top 10
2015	Helena Zuiani	Unplaced
2016	Yoana Don	Top 15
2017	Belén Garro	Did not compete
2018	Rocio Magali Pérez	Unplaced
2019	Milena Sofía Judt	Unplaced
2020	Due to the impact of COVID-19 pandemic, no pageant in 2020	
2021	Due to the impact of COVID-19 pandemic, no pageant in 2021	
2024	María Agostina Galfre	Unplaced
2025	Daiana Pereyra	Unplaced
