= Reinas de Costa Rica =

Beauty contest

- Formation: 1965
- Type: Beauty pageant
- Headquarters: San José
- Location: Costa Rica
- Members: Miss World; Miss International; Miss Earth; Miss Supranational
- Official language: Spanish
- President: Alan Aleman

Reinas de Costa Rica is a national beauty pageant in Costa Rica that selects representatives to the Miss World and Miss International pageant. After the Miss Costa Rica pageant stopped sending contestants to the Miss World and Miss International pageants in 2006, the franchise was acquired by the Reinas de Costa Rica organization presided by Alan Aleman. However, after two years of absence in the Miss World pageant in 2017-2018, the organization eventually lost the franchise to the newly established contest, Concurso Nacional de Belleza de Costa Rica in 2019. The organization also lost the Miss Earth franchise to Jose Vásconez in 2016.

This pageant is unrelated to the Miss Costa Rica Organization.

== Representatives at Big Four pageants ==
The following women have represented Costa Rica in three of the Big Four major international beauty pageants for women. These are Miss World, Miss International, and Miss Earth with the exception of Miss Universe which has its own national franchise in Costa Rica.

Color key

- Declared as Winner
- Ended as runner-up
- Ended as one of the finalists or semi-finalists

=== Representatives at Miss World ===
On occasion, when the candidate does not qualify (due to age) for either contest, another girl is sent.

In 2005, Costa Rica was crowned as Miss Asia Pacific International 2005. She withdrew the title and competed at the Miss World pageant. This is the first time Costa Rica withdrew the title as the reigning queen. Later in 2007, Committee Miss Costa Rica has created a separate pageant called "Reinas de Costa Rica" to select its representative for Miss World 2007 and then lost the franchise to the Concurso Nacional de Belleza de Costa Rica in 2019.

Year	Miss World Costa Rica	Province	Placement	Special Awards	Notes
Miss Costa Rica (1965 - 2006)
1965	Marta Eugenia Escalante Fernández	Puntarenas	Top 16		
1966	Sonia Mora	Heredia	Unplaced		
1967	Marjorie Furniss	Limón	Unplaced		
1968	Patricia Diers	Limón	Unplaced		
1969	Damaris Ureña	Guanacaste	Unplaced		
1970	No Representative				
1971	No Representative				
1972	Victoria Eugenia Ross González	San José	Unplaced		
1973	No Representative				
1974	Rose Marie Laprade Coto	Guanacaste	Unplaced		
1975	María Mayela Bolaños Ugalde	Distrito Capital	Unplaced		
1976	Ligia María Ramos Quesada	Distrito Capital	Unplaced		
1977	Carmen María Núñez Benavides	Distrito Capital	Unplaced		
1978	Maribel Fernández García	San José	Top 15		
1979	Maríanela Brealey Mora	Heredia	Unplaced		
1980	Marie Claire Tracy Coll	Guanacaste	Unplaced		
1981	Sucetty Salas Quintanilla	Puntarenas	Unplaced		
1982	Maureen Jiménez Solano	Distrito Capital	Unplaced		
1983	María Meléndez Herrera	Distrito Capital	Unplaced		
1984	Catalina María Blum Peña	Distrito Capital	Unplaced		
1985	Maríanela Herrera Marín	Distrito Capital	Unplaced		
1986	Ana Lorena González García	San José	Top 15		
1987	Alexandra Eugenia Martínez Fuentes	Puntarenas	Unplaced		
1988	Virginia Steinvorth Koberg	Alajuela	Unplaced		
1989	María Antonieta Sáenz Vargas	Limón	Unplaced		
1990	Andrea Murillo Fallas	Alajuela	Unplaced		
1991	Eugenie Jiménez Pacheco	Heredia	Unplaced		
1992	Marisol Soto Alarcón	San José	Unplaced		
1993	Laura Odio Salas	Distrito Capital	Unplaced		
1994	Silvia Ester Muñoz Mata	Distrito Capital	Unplaced		
1995	Shasling Navarro Aguilar	San José	Unplaced		
1996	Natalia Carvajal Lorenzo	Cartago	Unplaced		
1997	Rebeca Escalante Trejos	San José	Unplaced		
1998	María Luisa Ureña Salazar	Distrito Capital	Unplaced		
1999	Fiorella Martínez Martínez	Heredia	Unplaced		
2000	Cristine de Mezerville Ferreto	Heredia	Unplaced		
2001	Piarella Peralta Rodríguez	Limón	Unplaced	Miss Scholarship	
2002	No Representative				
2003	Shirley Alvárez Sandoval	Guanacaste	Unplaced		
2004	Shirley Calvo Jiménez	San José	Unplaced		
2005	Leonora Jiménez Monge	Alajuela	Unplaced		Miss Asia Pacific 2005
2006	Bélgica Arias Palomo	Guanacaste	Unplaced		
Reinas de Costa Rica (2007 - 2016)
2007	Wendy del Carmen Cordero Sánchez	Cartago	Unplaced		
2008	María Amalia Matamoros Solis	San José	Unplaced		
2009	Angie Catalina Alfaro Loria	Alajuela	Unplaced		
2010	Dayana Aguilera Sequeira	Alajuela	Unplaced		
2011	Paola Chaverri	Heredia	Unplaced		
2012	Silvana Sánchez Jiménez	San José	Unplaced		
2013	Yarly Marín Ledezma	Heredia	Unplaced		
2014	Mariam Natasha Sibaja Bermúdez	San José	Unplaced		
2015	Ángelica Reyes	Pérez Zeledón	Unplaced		
2016	Melania González Monge	San José	Unplaced		
2017	No Representative				
2018	No Representative				
Miss World Costa Rica (2019 - present)
2019	Jéssica Jiménez Muñoz	San José	Unplaced	Top 32 Miss World Sport	
2020	Due to the impact of COVID-19 pandemic, no pageant in 2020				
2021	Tamara Dal Maso	Puntarenas	Unplaced		
2023	Krisly Salas Delgado	Alajuela	Unplaced		
2024	No competition held				
2025	No competition held				
2026	No competition held				

=== Representatives at Miss International ===
Before joining to Reinas de Costa Rica, the 1st runner-up or Winner of Miss Costa Rica represented her country at the Miss International pageant. On occasion, when the candidate does not qualify (due to age) for either contest, another girl is sent. As of 2003, Committee Miss Costa Rica has created a separate pageant called "Reinas de Costa Rica" to select its representative for Miss International 2003.

Year	Miss International Costa Rica	Province	Placement	Special Awards	Notes
1965	Ana Koberg	Limón	Unplaced		
1966	Pageant did not held				
1967	No Representative				
1968	Ana María Rivera	Distrito Capital	Unplaced		
1969	Sonia Kohkemper	Cartago	Unplaced		
1970	Haydée Brenes	Puntarenas	Top 15		
1971	No Representative				
1972	Isabel Amador	San José	Unplaced		
1973	No Representative				
1974	Ilse Magdolna von Herold	San Jose	Unplaced		
1975	María Lidieth Mora Badilla	Cartago	Unplaced		
1976	Maritza Elizabeth Ortiz Calvo	Cartago	Unplaced		
1977	Hannia Chavarria Córdoba	Alajuela	Unplaced		
1978	Marlene Lourdes Amador Barrenechea	Guanacaste	Unplaced		
1979	María Lorena Acuña Karpinski	San José	Unplaced		
1980	Lorna Marlene Chávez Mata	Distrito Capital	Miss International 1980	Best National Costume	
1981	Trylce Jirón García	Limón	Unplaced		
1982	Sigrid Lizano Mejía	Heredia	Unplaced		
1983	Gidget Sandoval Herrera	San José	Miss International 1983		
1984	Mónica Zamora Velasco	Puntarenas	Unplaced		
1985	Maríanela Herrera Marín	Distrito Capital	Unplaced		
1986	Ana Lorena González García	San José	Unplaced		
1987	Alexandra Eugenia Martínez Fuentes	Puntarenas	Unplaced		
1988	Erika María Paoli González	Limón	Top 15		
1989	María Antonieta Sáenz Vargas	Limón	Unplaced		
1990	Andrea Murillo Fallas	Alajuela	Unplaced		
1991	Eugenie Jiménez Pacheco	Heredia	Unplaced		
1992	Marisol Soto Alarcón	San José	Unplaced		
1993	Laura Odio Salas	Distrito Capital	Unplaced		
1994	Silvia Ester Muñoz Mata	Distrito Capital	Unplaced		
1995	No Representative				
1996	No Representative				
1997	No Representative				
1998	No Representative				
1999	No Representative				
2000	No Representative				
2001	No Representative				
2002	No Representative				
2003	Merilyn Villalta Castro	Distrito Capital	Unplaced		
2004	Tatiana Vargas Cruz	Alajuela	Unplaced		
2007	Ibis Leonela Paniagua Viales	Guanacaste	Unplaced		
2010	Mariela Aparicio Alfaro	San José	Top 15		
2011	María Fernanda Arias	Alajuela	Unplaced		
2012	Mariam Natasha Sibaja Bermúdez	San José	Unplaced		
2013	Andrea María Rojas Pacheco	San José	Unplaced		
2015	Melania González Monge	San José	Unplaced		
2016	Raquel Guevara	San José	Unplaced		
2017	Paola Chacón	San José	Unplaced		
2018	Glennys Medina Segura	Guanacaste	Unplaced		
2019	Tamara Dal Maso	San José	Unplaced		
2020	Due to the impact of COVID-19 pandemic, no pageant in 2020				
2021	Due to the impact of COVID-19 pandemic, no pageant in 2021				
2022	Mahyla Roth Benavides	Limón	Top 15		
2023	Stacy Montero Camacho	Limón	Unplaced		
2024	Jussan Ariana Sandoval Espinoza	Alajuela	Unplaced		
2025	Shakira Graham	Limón	Unplaced		
2026	No Representative				

=== Representatives at Miss Earth ===
During 2007 - 2015, the Costa Rica representatives at Miss Earth were sent by Reinas de Costa Rica. After the absence in 2016, a Costa Rican producer Jose Vásconez acquired the franchise and ran the pageant separately to select the country representatives for Miss Earth. Vásconez also serves as the national director of Miss Intercontinental Costa Rica.

Year	Miss Earth Costa Rica	Province	Placement	Special Awards	Notes
Miss Costa Rica (2002—2006)
2002	Maria del Mar Ruiz	San José	Unplaced		
2003	Marianela Zeledón Bolaños	San José	Miss Earth Water (2nd Runner-up)		
2004	Karlota Calderon Brenes	San Jose	Unplaced		
2005	No Representative				
2006	Mari Paz Duarte	San Jose	Unplaced		
Reinas de Costa Rica (2007—2015)
2007	Natalia Mattey Salas	Guanacaste	Unplaced		
2008	Wendy Cordero Sánchez	Guanacaste	Unplaced		
2009	Malena de los Ángeles	San José	Unplaced		
2010	Allyson Alfaro Caravaca	Distrito Capital	Unplaced		
2011	No Representative				
2012	Fabiana Granados Herrera	Guanacaste	Top 16	Miss Ever Bilena; (bronze) Resorts Wear (Group 2); (bronze) Miss Photogenic	Miss Costa Rica 2013
2013	Mariela Aparicio Alfaro	San José	Unplaced	Best in Swimsuit (Top 15)	Top 10 Miss Grand International 2015
No Representative since 2014—2016
Miss Earth Costa Rica (2017—present)
2017	Fernanda Rodríguez	Alajuela	Unplaced	(silver) Long Gown (Group 2)	
2018	Arianna Medrano	Puntarenas	Unplaced		
2019	Linda Ávila	San José	Unplaced		
2020	Kelly Avila Mora	San José	Top 20	(bronze) National Costume (America); (silver) Talent (Sing) (America); (gold) Best Eco-Video (America)	
No Representative since 2021—2023
2024	Sharon Recinos	Heredia	Unplaced		
2026	TBA	TBA	TBA		

=== Representatives at Miss Supranational ===
Year	Miss Supranational Costa Rica	Province	Placement	Special Awards	Notes
2026	Fiorella Araya	Heredia	Unplaced		
2025	Fabiola Vindas	Limón	Top 12		
2024	Maria Jose Segura	San Jose	Unplaced		
2023	Margaret Gray Carrillo	San José	Unplaced		
2022	Natalia González Solorzano	San José	Unplaced		
Due to the impact of COVID-19 pandemic, no competition held between 2020—2021
2019	Lohana Aguilar	Cartago	Unplaced		
2018	Allyson Alfaro Caravaca	San José	Unplaced		
2017	Nicole Menayo Alvarado	Heredia	Top 10		
2016	Paola Chacón Fuentes	San José	Unplaced		
2015	Mónica Zamora Chavarría	San José	Unplaced		
2014	Claudia Gallo Salazar	San José	Unplaced		
2013	Elena Correa Usuga	San José	Unplaced		
2012	Karina Ramos Leitón	San José	Top 20		
