= Lint, Belgium =

Lint
- Municipality
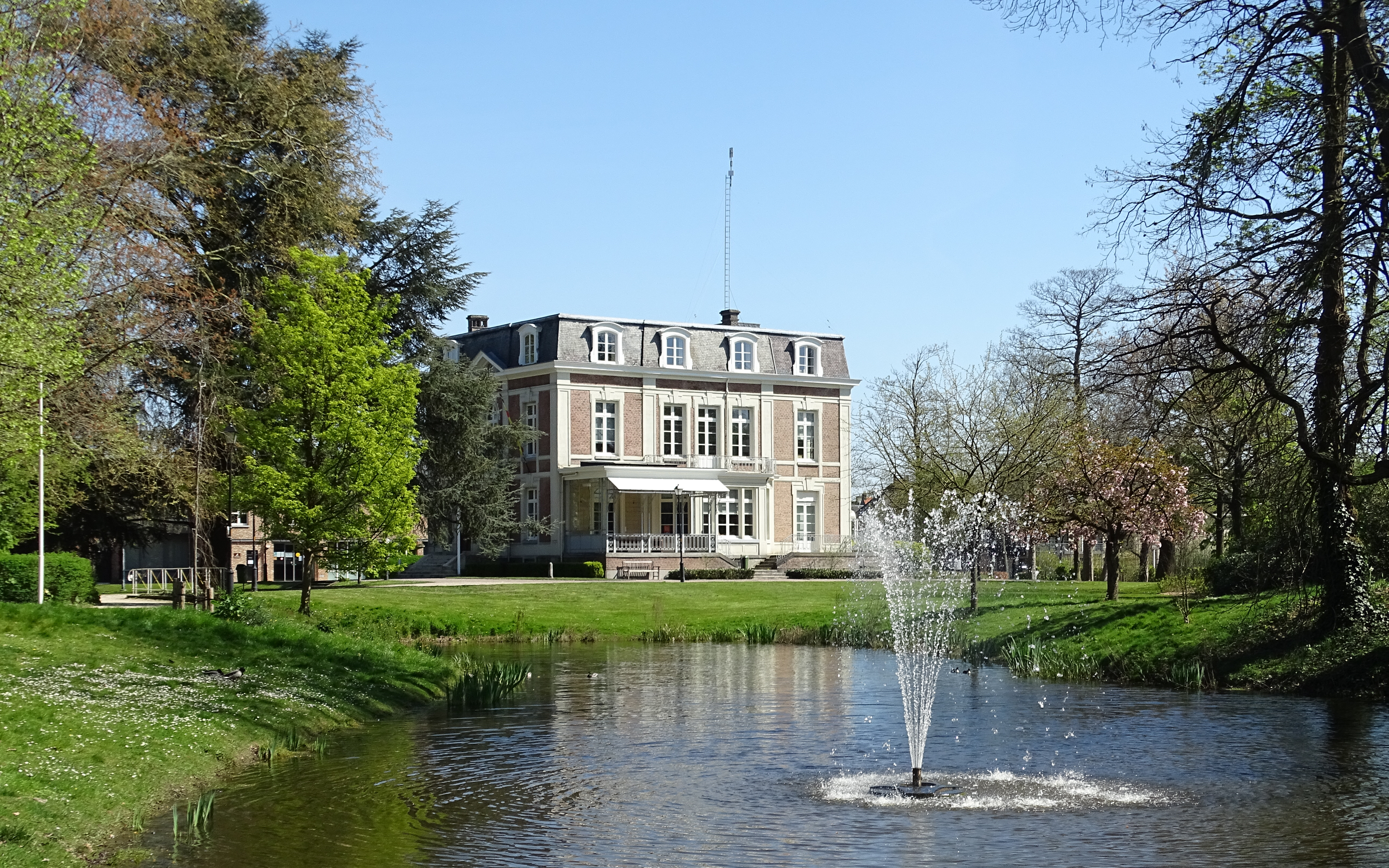
- Lindenhof

- Flag Coat of arms

- Location of Lint in Antwerp
- Interactive map of Lint
- Location in Belgium
- Coordinates: 51°07′N 04°29′E
- Country: Belgium
- Community: Flemish Community
- Region: Flemish Region
- Province: Antwerp
- Arrondissement: Antwerp

Government
  - Mayor: Rudy Verhoeven (N-VA)
  - Governing parties: N-VA, CD&V

Area
  - Total: 5.65 km^{2} (2.18 sq mi)

Population (2020-01-01)
  - Total: 8,641
  - Density: 1,530/km^{2} (3,960/sq mi)
- Postal codes: 2547
- NIS code: 11025
- Area codes: 03

Lint (Dutch pronunciation: [lɪnt]) is a municipality located in the Belgian province of Antwerp. The municipality only comprises the town of Lint proper. In 2024, Lint had a total population of 8,505. The total area is 5.57 km^{2}.

== Famous inhabitants ==
- Dirk Sterckx, member of the European Parliament (VLD)
- Nico Van Kerkhoven, football player, former in Belgium national team
- Matz Sels, football player
- Lea Couzin, actress,
- Karen Damen, singer, actress
- Anneke Van Hooff, singer, actress
- Ann Van den Broeck, musical actress
- Bart Debie, politician
