= List of Kosovo Albanians =

This is a list of historical and living notable Kosovar Albanians (ethnic Albanian people from Kosovo or people of full or partial Kosovar Albanian ancestry), sorted by occupation and name:

== Academics, writers ==
- Idriz Ajeti - linguist and professor
- Ag Apolloni - writer and professor
- Anton Berisha - scholar and folklorist
- Pjetër Bogdani - Catholic priest and author
- Flora Brovina - poet, pediatrician and women's rights activist
- Islam Dobra - historian and writer
- Sabri Hamiti - poet and professor
- Rifat Kukaj - writer
- Din Mehmeti - poet
- Ali Podrimja - poet
- Rexhep Qosja - writer and professor
- Azem Shkreli - poet

== Military personnel ==
- Idriz Seferi - nationalist guerrilla fighter
- Azem Galica - nationalist resistance fighter
- Isa Boletini - nationalist guerrilla fighter
- Asim Vokshi - volunteer in Spanish Civil War
- Sulejman Vokshi - military leader and commander of the League of Prizren
- Haxhi Zeka - nationalist leader
- Bislim Bajgora - nationalist leader
- Shote Galica - nationalist guerrilla fighter who was declared as the People's Heroine of Albania
- Mic Sokoli - nationalist figure and guerrilla fighter
- Shaban Polluzha - military leader
- Idriz Gjilani - KLA commander
- Zahir Pajaziti - KLA commander
- Adem Jashari - KLA commander
- Agim Ramadani - KLA commander
- Njazi Azemi - KLA commander

== Actors and actresses ==
- Bekim Fehmiu- actor
- Muharrem Qena - actor, director, writer and singer
- Abduhrraman Shala - actor born in Vushtrri
- Adem Mikullovci- actor born in Vushtrri
- Hazir Miftari- actor born in Vushtrri
- Faruk Begolli - actor
- James Biberi - American actor, who was born in Kosovo
- Arta Dobroshi - actress, notable works include Lorna's Silence and Baby
- Fortesa Hoti - Swedish actress, best known for her role as Roxana Nilsson, in the Swedish drama series Andra Avenyn, born in Kosovo
- Arta Muçaj - actress born in Prizren Kosovo. Known for roles in Home Sweet Home as Hana and Njerez dhe Fate (People and Destinies) as Didi. Based in Australia.
- Enver Petrovci - actor, writer and director
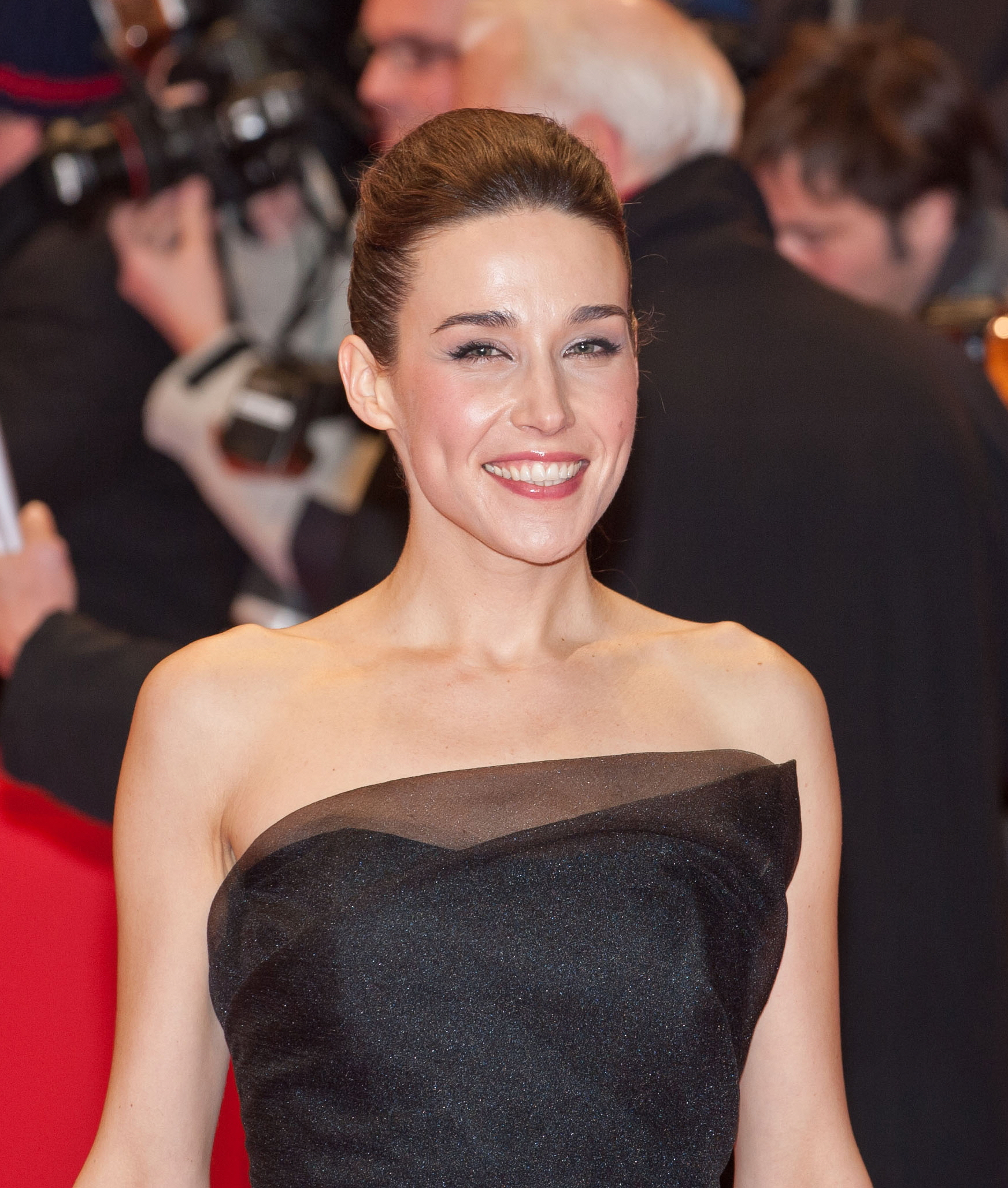
Dobroshi

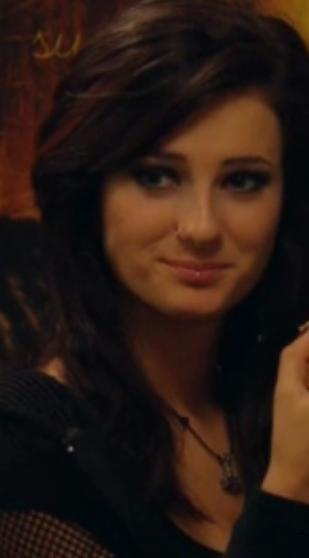
Hoti

== Entertainment and media ==
- Esat Bicurri - singer
- Ardian Bujupi - German-Kosovar singer-songwriter, who finished in third place of the 8th season of the German talent show Deutschland Sucht den SuperStar, born in Pristina
- Rauf Dhomi - classical music composer and conductor
- Rona Nishliu - singer
- Tony Dovolani - professional ballroom dancer, instructor and judge based in New York
- Gashi - rapper
- Adelina Ismajli - singer, actress and model who was crowned Miss Kosovo in 1997
- Era Istrefi - singer-songwriter
- Akil Mark Koci - composer from Prizren
- Memli Krasniqi - rapper, singer-songwriter, politician and spokesperson; minister the Culture, Youth and Sport of the Republic of Kosovo
- Albina Kelmendi - singer and runner-up of the fourth season of The Voice of Albania
- Zana Krasniqi - model and Miss Universe Kosovo 2008
- Zana Nimani - Belgrade-based former singer, parents from Kosovo
- Patrick Nuo - Swiss recording artist and actor, the father is an Albanian from Gjakova
- Rita Ora - British singer-songwriter and actress, born in Pristina
- Dua Lipa - British pop singer, parents are immigrants from Kosovo, fleeing during the war
- Ismet Peja - folk singer
- Nexhmije Pagarusha - singer, known for song "Baresha"
- Shkëlzen Doli - violinist
- Leonora Jakupi - singer
- Nita Bahtiri - Kosovar singer and pianist
- Lindita - Kosovo-Albanian singer-songwriter
- Regard - DJ
- Gjon's Tears - Swiss singer-songwriter
- Faton Flow Loshi - DJ, Producer, Writer
- Ledri Vula - singer
- Njomza - singer-songwriter
- Dafina Zeqiri - singer-songwriter
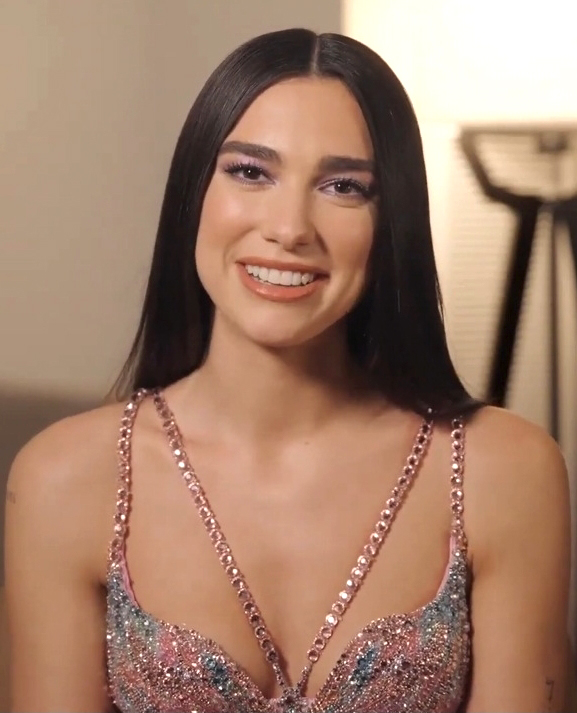
Dua Lipa

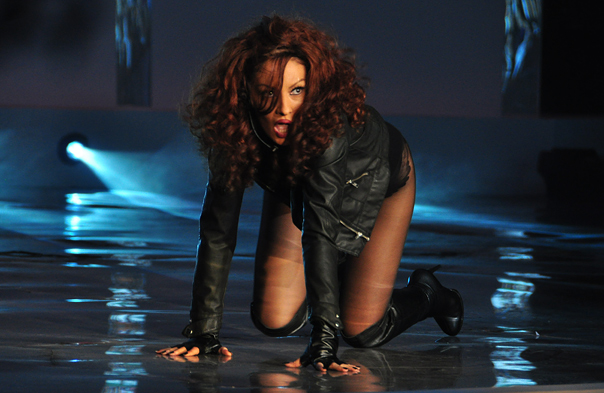
Ismajli

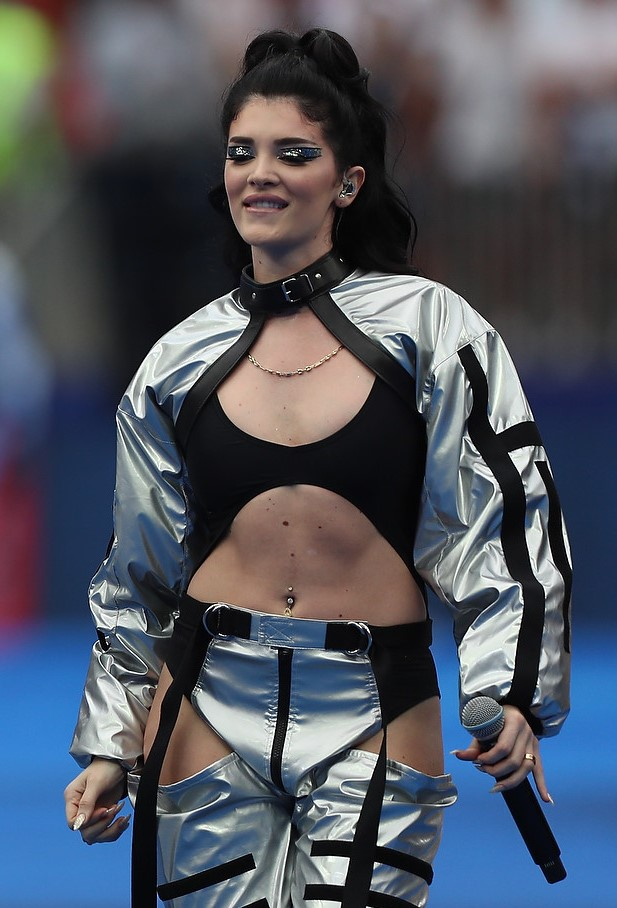
Istrefi

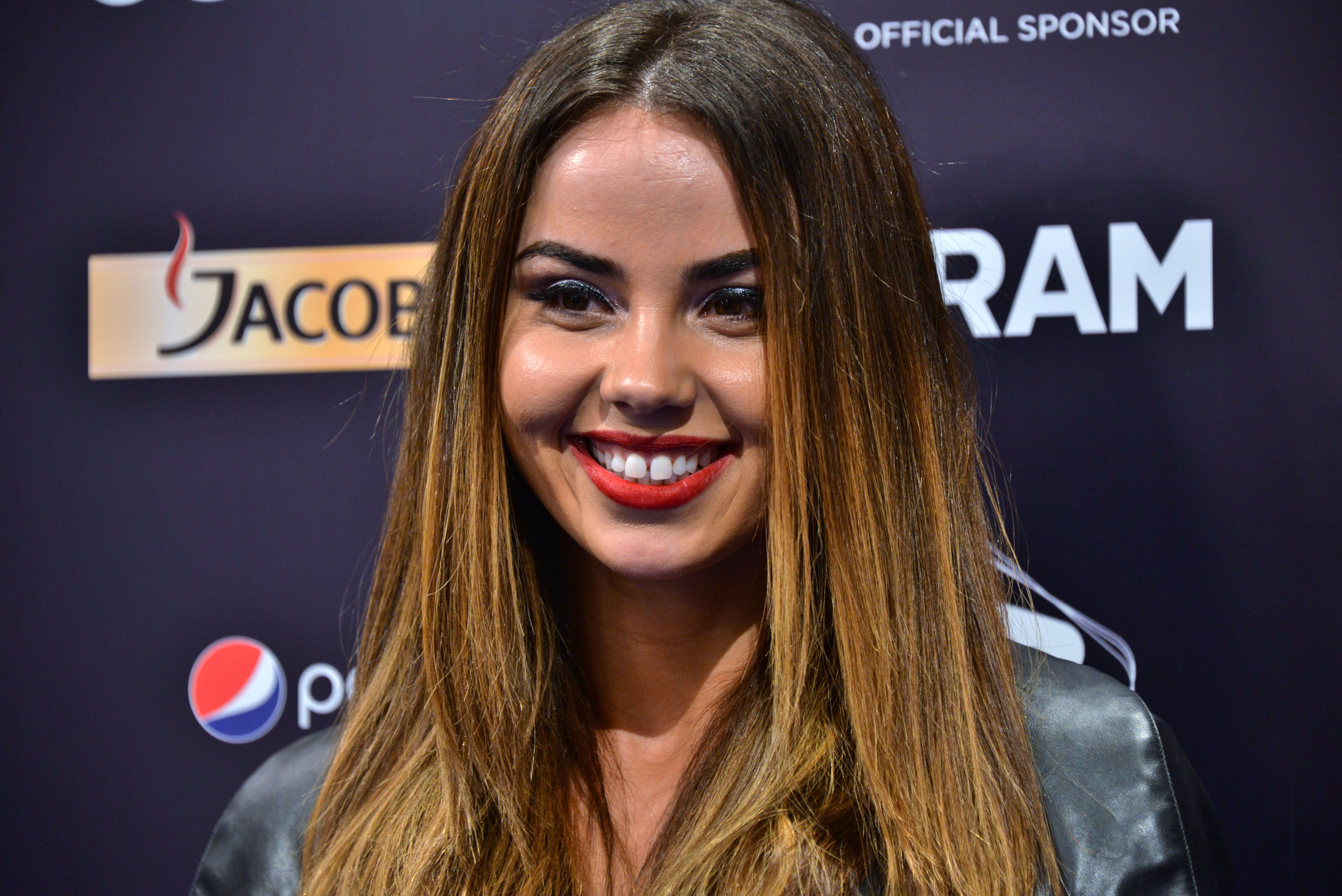
Lindita

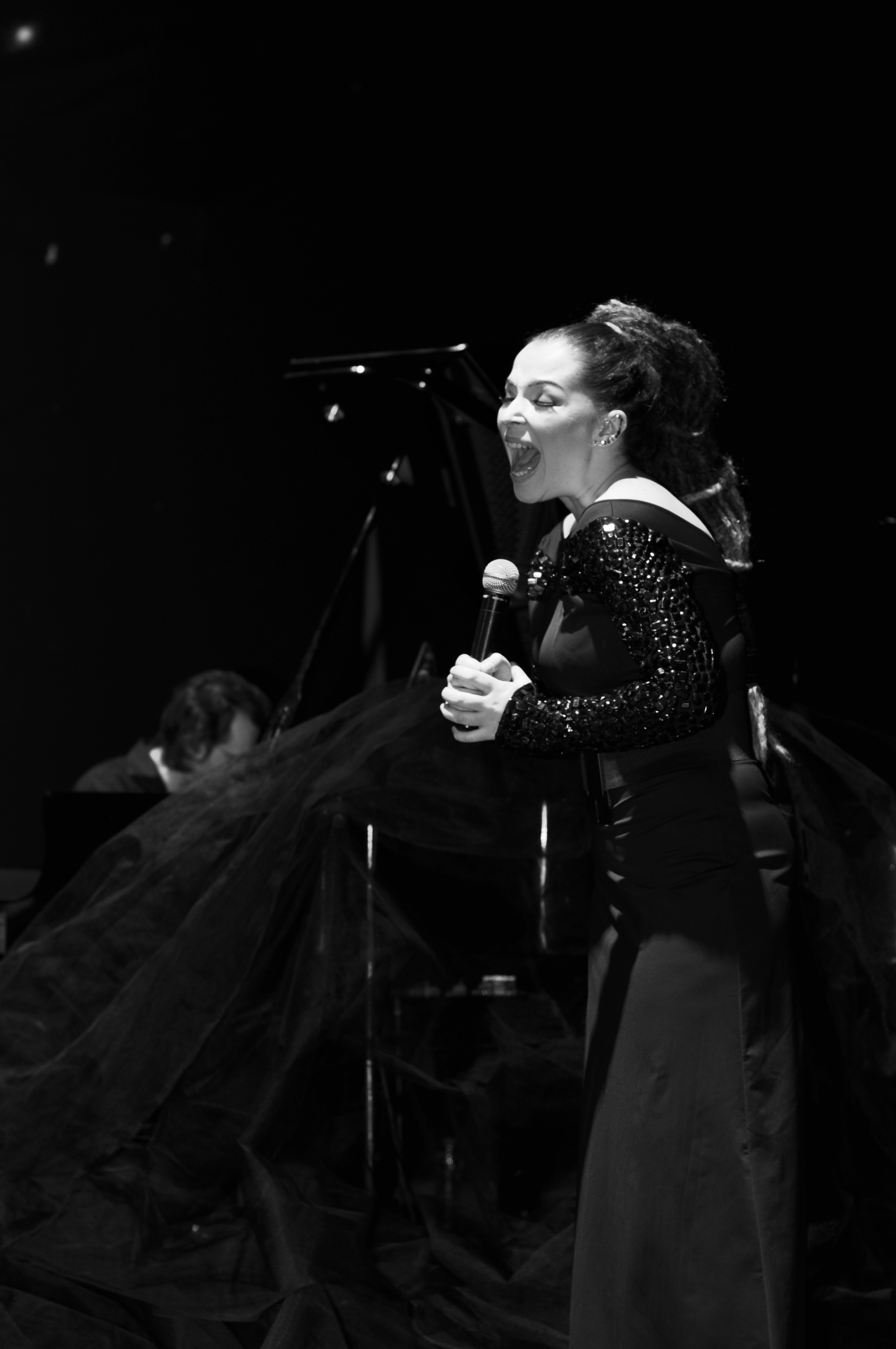
Nishliu

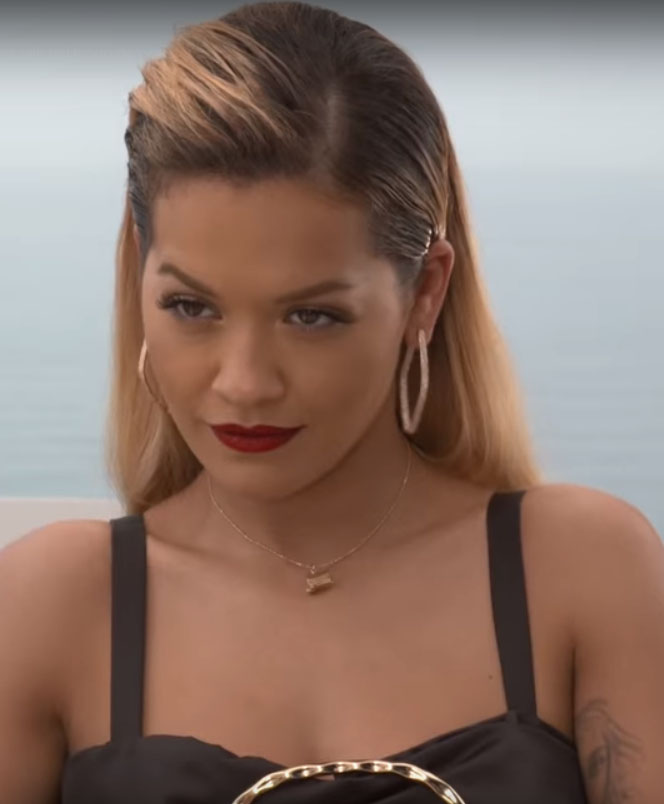
Ora

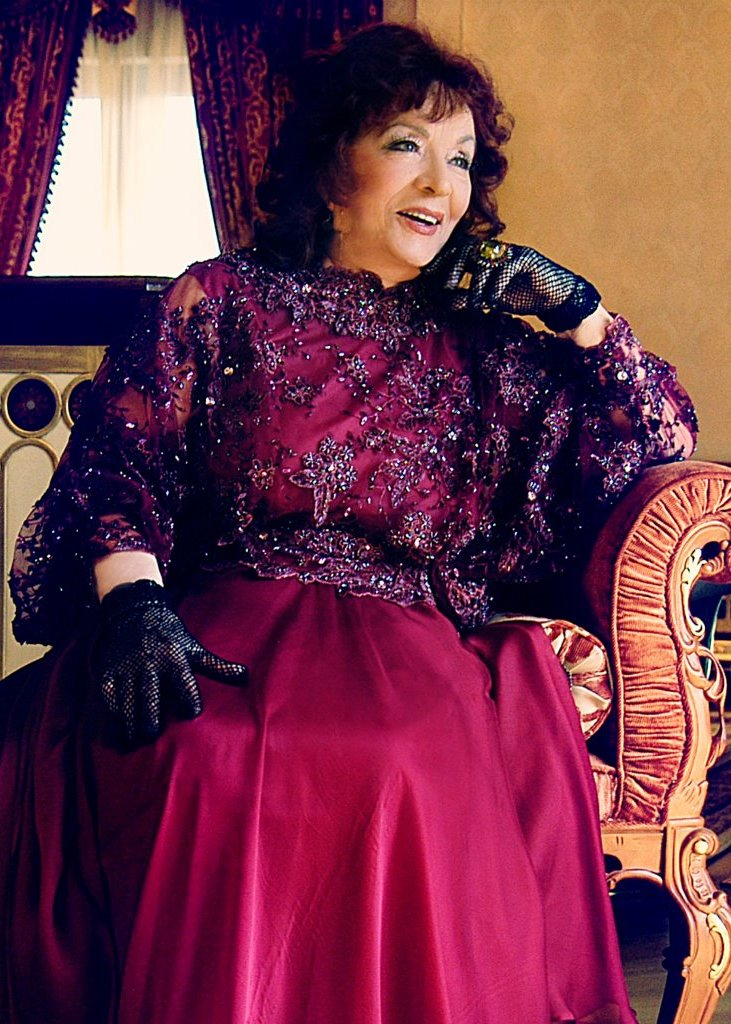
Pagarusha

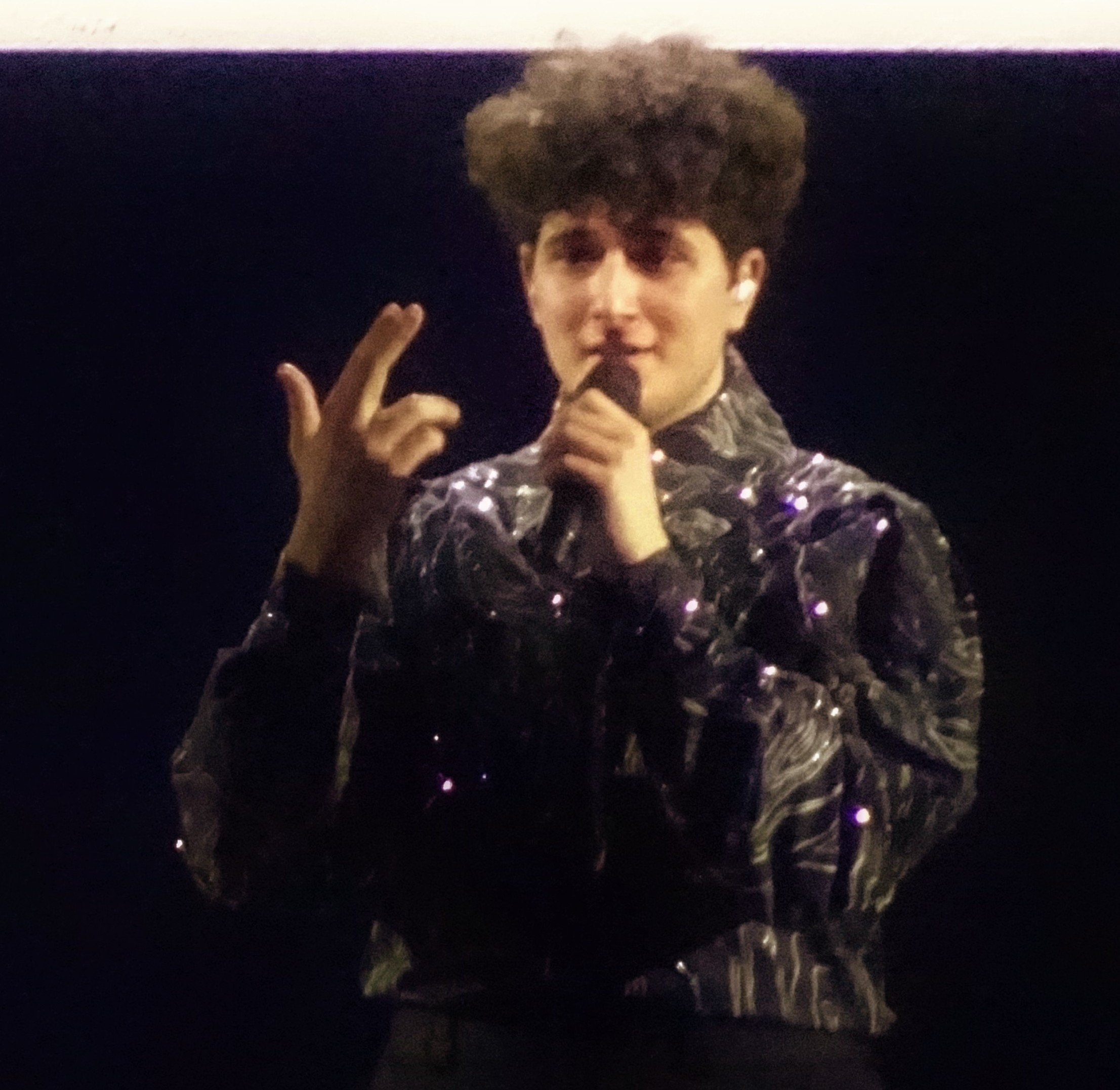
Gjon's Tears

== Visual arts and design ==
- Rifo Dobra - photographer
- Gazmend Freitag - painter
- Lirika Matoshi - fashion designer
- Teuta Matoshi - fashion designer
- Eshref Qahili - Painter, contemporary and conceptual visual artist
- Burim Myftiu - American contemporary photographer, born in Prizren
- Ramadan Ramadani - painter and artist
- Mustafa Presheva - Turkish film editor

== Models ==
- Diana Avdiu - Kosovar Albanian model and beauty pageant titleholder who was crowned Miss Universe Kosovo 2012
- Marigona Dragusha - model who was crowned Miss Universe Kosovo in 2009; second runner-up in Miss Universe 2009
- Donika Emini - Kosovar Albanian model and beauty pageant titleholder who was crowned Miss Universe Kosovo
- Zana Krasniqi - Kosovar Albanian fashion model and beauty pageant titleholder who won Miss Universe Kosovo 2008
- Mirjeta Shala - Kosovar Albanian model
- Zana Berisha - Kosovar Albanian model and beauty pageant titleholder who won Miss Kosovo 2018

== Business and entrepreneurship ==
- Florin Krasniqi - American businessman and political activist
- Shkëlzen Shala - veganism activist and entrepreneur
- Ramiz Tafilaj - American businessman, activist, visionary and publisher

== Politics ==
- Albin Kurti - current Prime Minister of Kosovo
- Vjosa Osmani - current President of Kosovo
- Lulzim Basha - Albanian politician. He is the chairman of the Democratic Party of Albania, the main opposition party, since 2013.
- Agim Çeku - minister of security forces for the Republic of Kosovo
- Bajram Curri - minister of defence of Albania, member of the Committee for the National Defence of Kosovo, independence activist
- Nexhat Daci - member of the Assembly of Kosovo
- Nexhip Draga - politician and deputy of the Ottoman and later of the Yugoslav parliament
- Jakup Krasniqi - spokesman for the Kosovo Liberation Army (during the Kosovo war); Former Chairman of the Assembly of Kosovo (2007–2014); Former Acting President of Kosovo.
- Ramush Haradinaj - former Prime Minister of Kosovo (2004–05)
- Sinan Hasani - former president of Yugoslavia (1986–1987), novelist, statesman and diplomat
- Ali Kelmendi - communist organiser
- Hasan Prishtina - former Prime Minister, nationalist, organizer of Albanian movements against Ottomans and other regimes installed in Kosovo, during the end of the 19th and beginning of the 20th century
- Ymer Prizreni - cleric, jurist, politician, scholar and patriot, head leader of the Albanian League of Prizren
- Bajram Rexhepi - Prime Minister of Kosovo 2002-2004
- Ibrahim Rugova - first president of Kosovo (1992–2000) and (2002–2006)
- Fatmir Sejdiu - first president of the Republic of Kosovo (2006–2010)
- Hashim Thaçi - former Prime Minister and President of Kosovo
- Azem Vllasi - senior politician and lawyer

== Sports ==
=== Football ===
- Ardit Tahiri - footballer
- Allmir Ademi - Albanian-Swiss footballer
- Fidan Aliti - footballer
- Enis Alushi - footballer
- Donis Avdijaj - footballer
- Ilir Azemi - footballer
- Zymer Bytyqi - footballer
- Adnan Januzaj - Belgian footballer, parents are from the Republic of Kosovo, of both Kosovan and Turkish descent
- Agon Mehmeti - footballer
- Albert Bunjaku - Swiss-Albanian footballer
- Almir Murati - Swiss footballer
- Arian Beqaj - footballer
- Fatos Beqiraj - Montenegrian footballer
- Astrit Ajdarević - Swedish footballer, born in Pristina
- Beg Ferati - Swiss footballer, born in Pristina
- Bernard Berisha - footballer
- Besart Berisha - footballer
- Valon Berisha - footballer
- Mërgim Brahimi - footballer
- Bersant Celina - footballer
- Debatik Curri - footballer
- Ardin Dallku - footballer
- Ibrahim Drešević - footballer
- Lorik Emini - footballer
- Betim Fazliji - footballer
- Ardian Gashi - footballer
- Besian Idrizaj - Austrian footballer, parents are from Kosovo
- Besar Halimi - footballer
- Besnik Hasi - football player and manager
- Mehmet Hetemaj - footballer
- Ylldren Ibrahimaj - footballer
- Blendi Idrizi - footballer
- Flamur Kastrati - footballer
- Kushtrim Lushtaku - footballer
- Alban Meha - footballer
- Arijanet Muric - footballer
- Florent Muslija - footballer
- Besar Musolli - footballer
- Atdhe Nuhiu - footballer
- Leart Paqarada - footballer
- Avni Pepa - footballer
- Fanol Përdedaj - footballer
- Amir Rrahmani - footballer
- Elbasan Rashani - footballer
- Anel Rashkaj - footballer
- Dardan Rexhepi - footballer
- Loret Sadiku - footballer
- Herolind Shala - footballer
- Valmir Sulejmani - footballer
- Gjelbrim Taipi - footballer
- Samir Ujkani - footballer
- Mërgim Vojvoda - footballer
- Eroll Zejnullahu - footballer
- Arbër Zeneli - footballer
- Edon Zhegrova - footballer
- Drilon Shala - Finnish footballer, parents are from the Republic of Kosovo
- Dren Feka - German footballer, parents are from Kosovo
- Emir Bajrami - Swedish footballer, born in Pristina
- Erton Fejzullahu - Swedish footballer, born in Mitrovica
- Fatmire Bajramaj (Alushi) - German footballer, born in Kosovo
- Faton Toski - German footballer, born in Kosovo
- Gezim Ljalja - Kosovar Albanian footballer
- Granit Xhaka - Swiss footballer, an ethnic Albanian born in Kosovo
- Johan Berisha - Swiss footballer
- Kosovare Asllani - Swedish footballer, parents migrated from Kosovo to Sweden
- Kristian Nushi - footballer
- Labinot Haliti - Australian-Albanian footballer, born in Pristina
- Labinot Harbuzi - Swedish footballer, parents migrated from Kosovo to Sweden
- Liridon Krasniqi - footballer born in Vitina, representing Kosovo and later Malaysia
- Lorik Cana - footballer
- Mehmet Dragusha - footballer
- Mentor Zhubi - Swedish footballer, born in Kosovo
- Milaim Rama - Swiss footballer, German Regional Liga Nord, born in Kosovo
- Milot Rashica - footballer, born in Vushtrri, Kosovo
- Njazi Kuqi - Finnish footballer, born in Kosovo
- Rijat Shala - Swiss footballer, born in Prizren, Kosovo
- Shefki Kuqi - Finnish footballer, born in the Kosovo
- Shpetim Hasani - footballer
- Sokol Maliqi - Swiss-Albanian footballer
- Valdet Rama - footballer born in Mitrovica
- Valon Behrami - Swiss footballer, born in Mitrovica
- Xherdan Shaqiri - Swiss footballer, born in Kosovo
- Xhevat Prekazi - football player and manager of Kosovar Albanian descent.
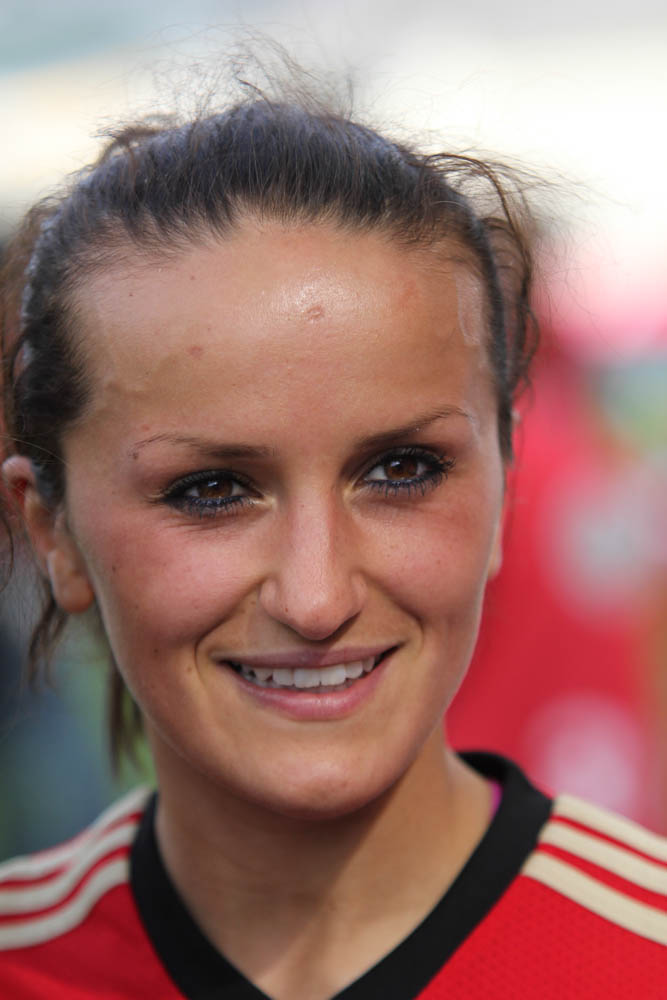
Alushi

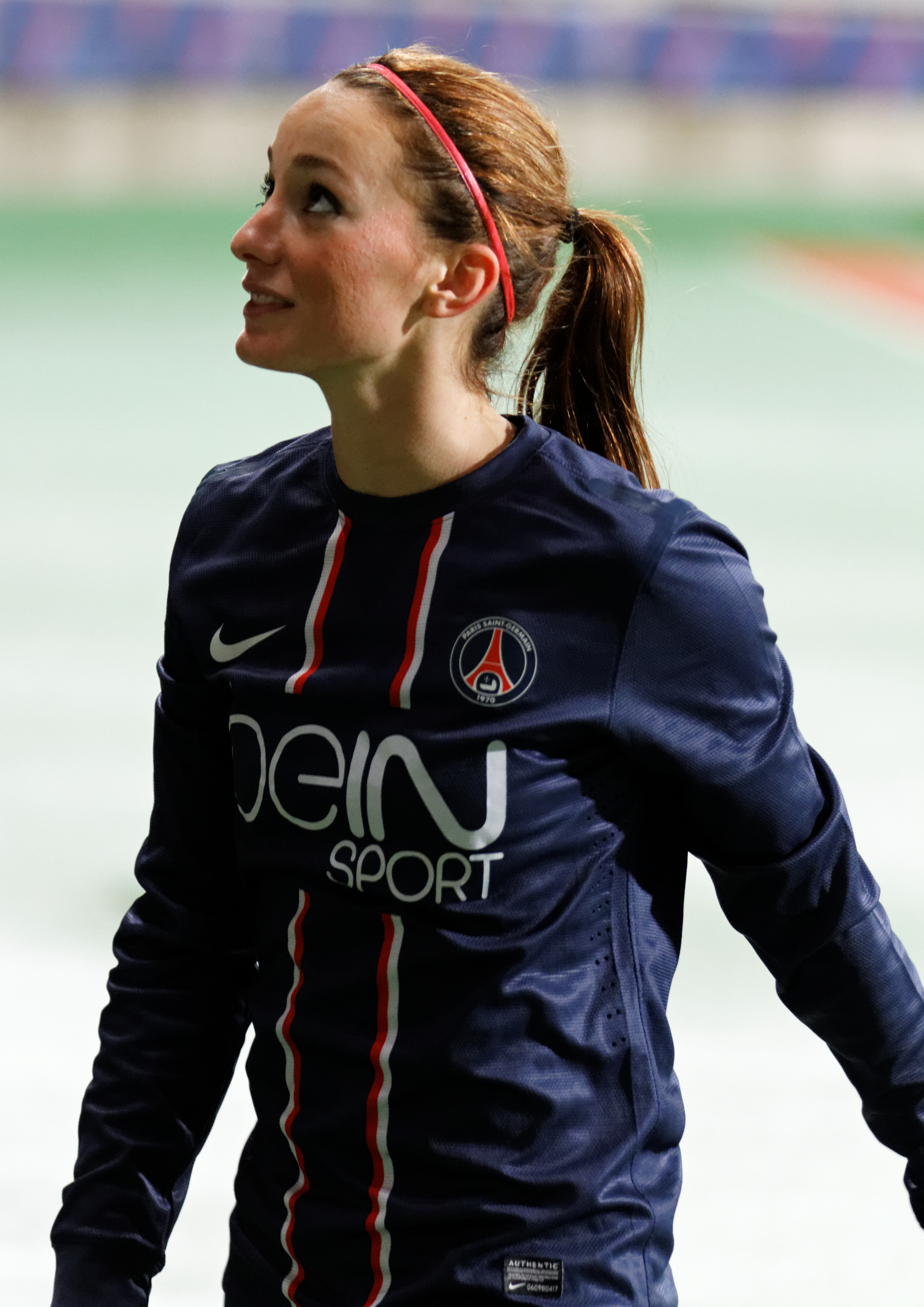
Asllani

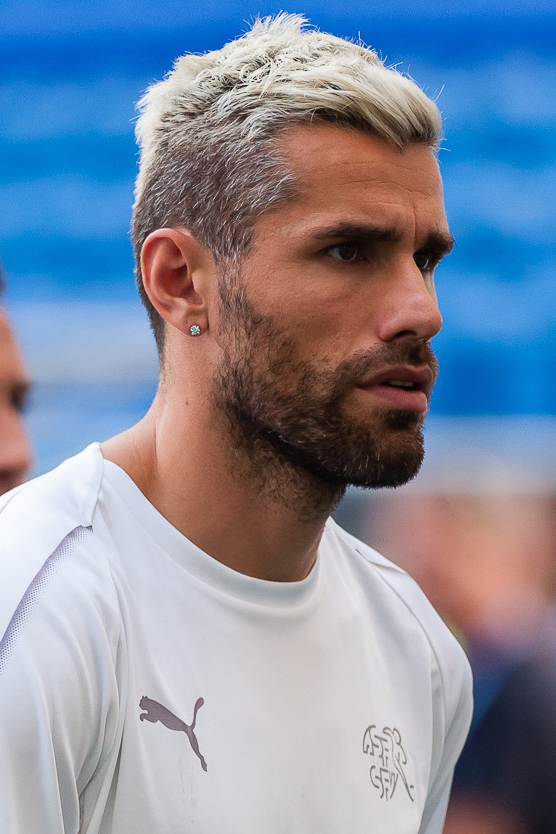
Behrami

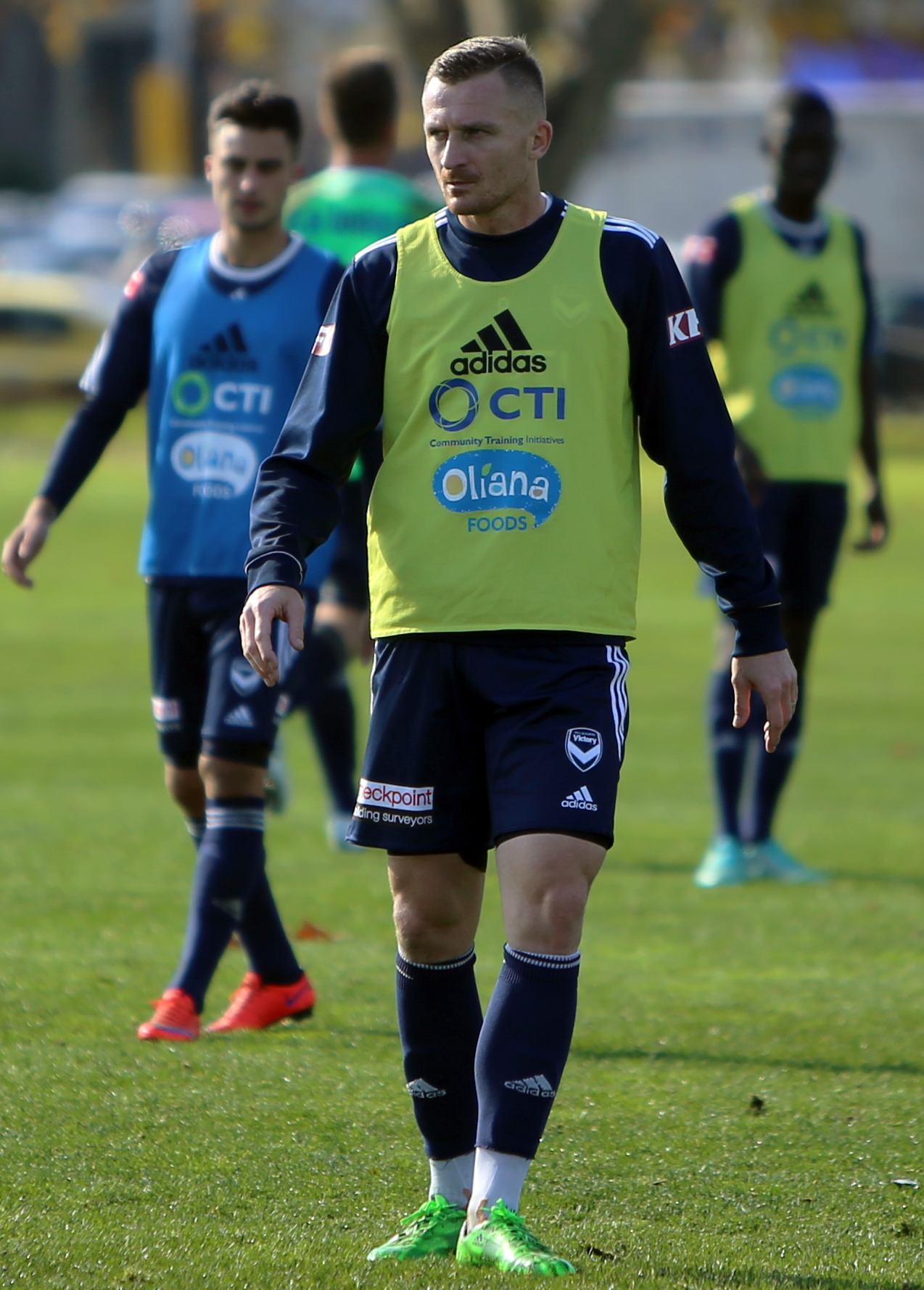
B. Berisha

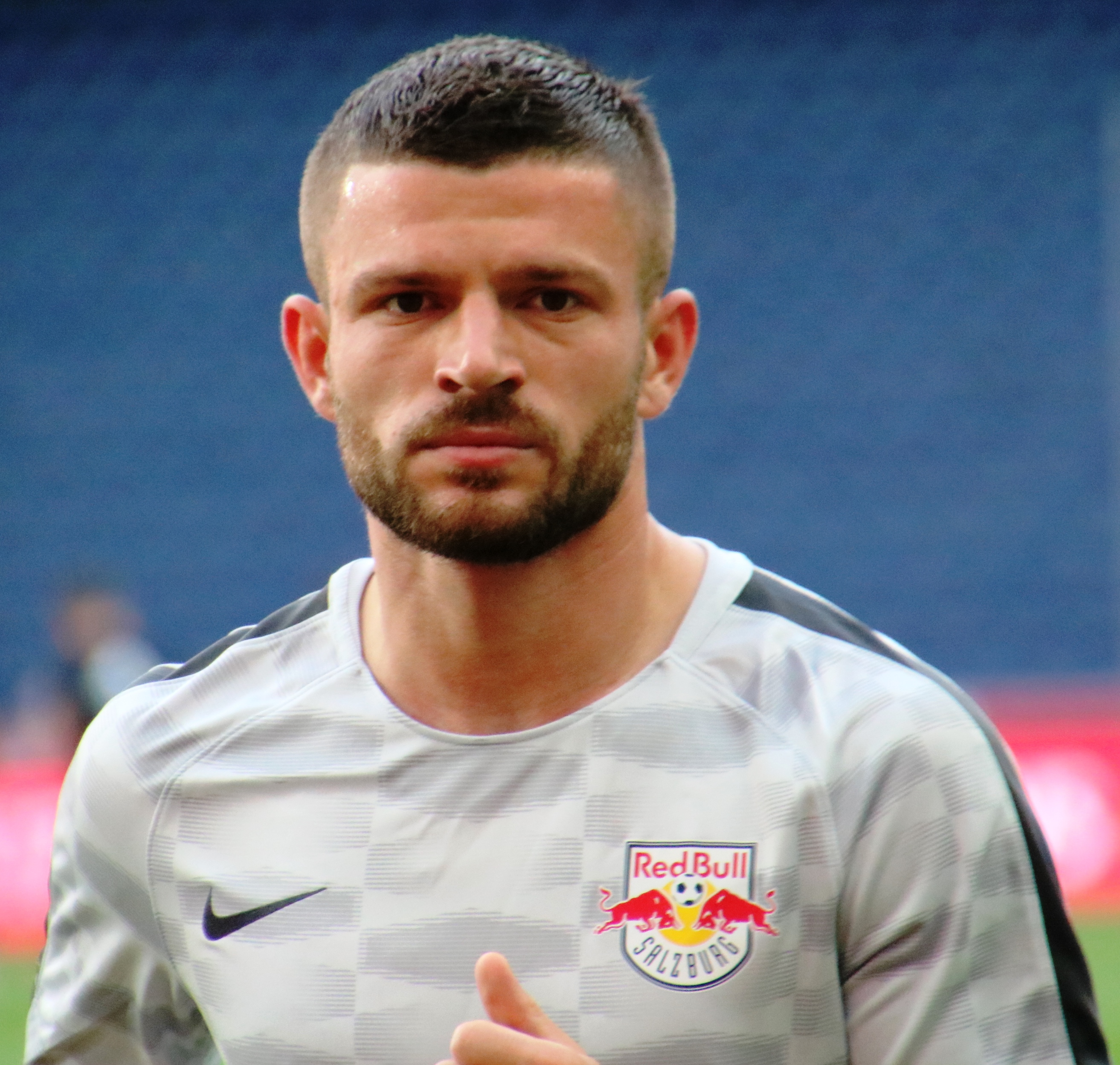
V. Berisha

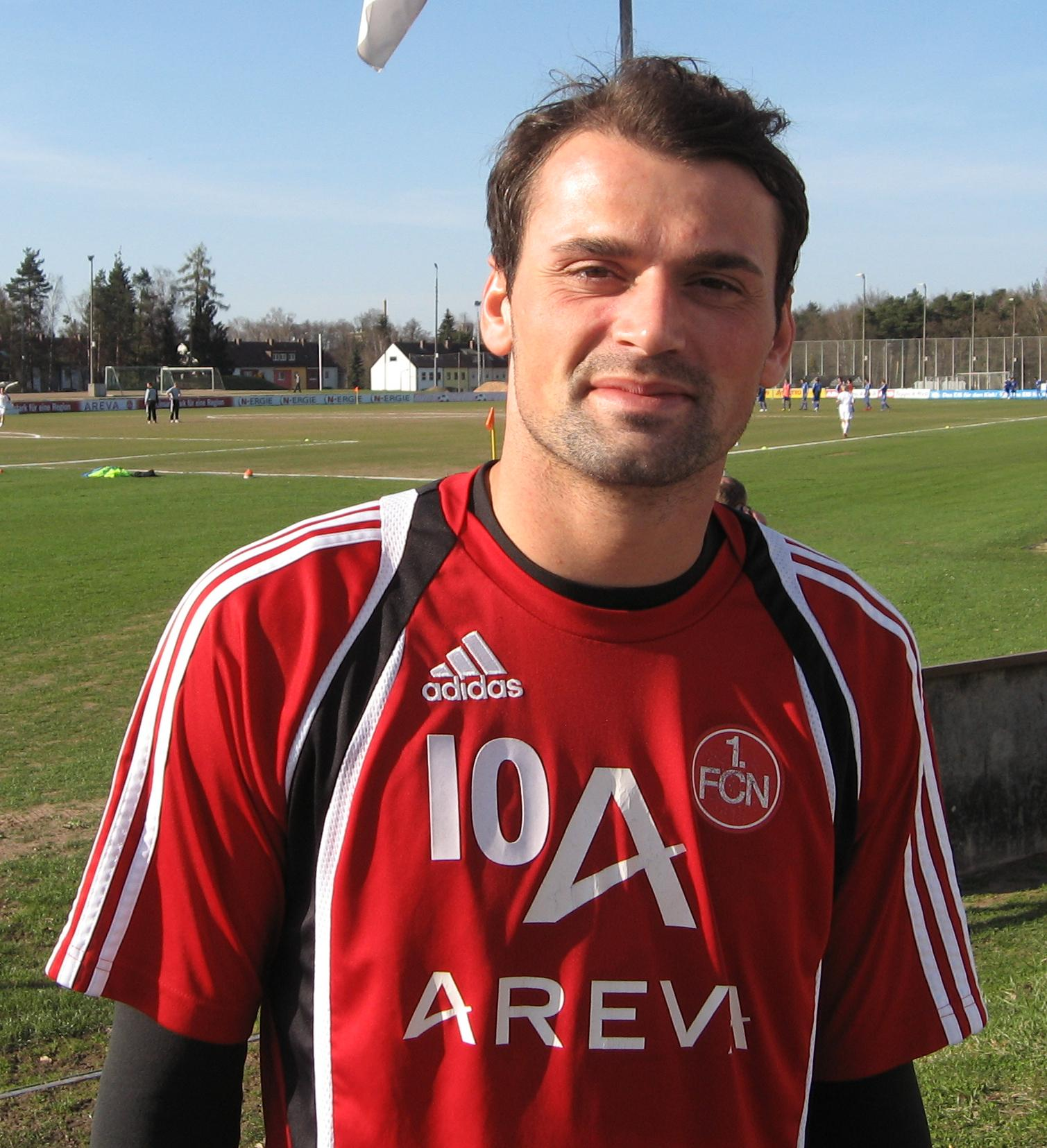
Bunjaku

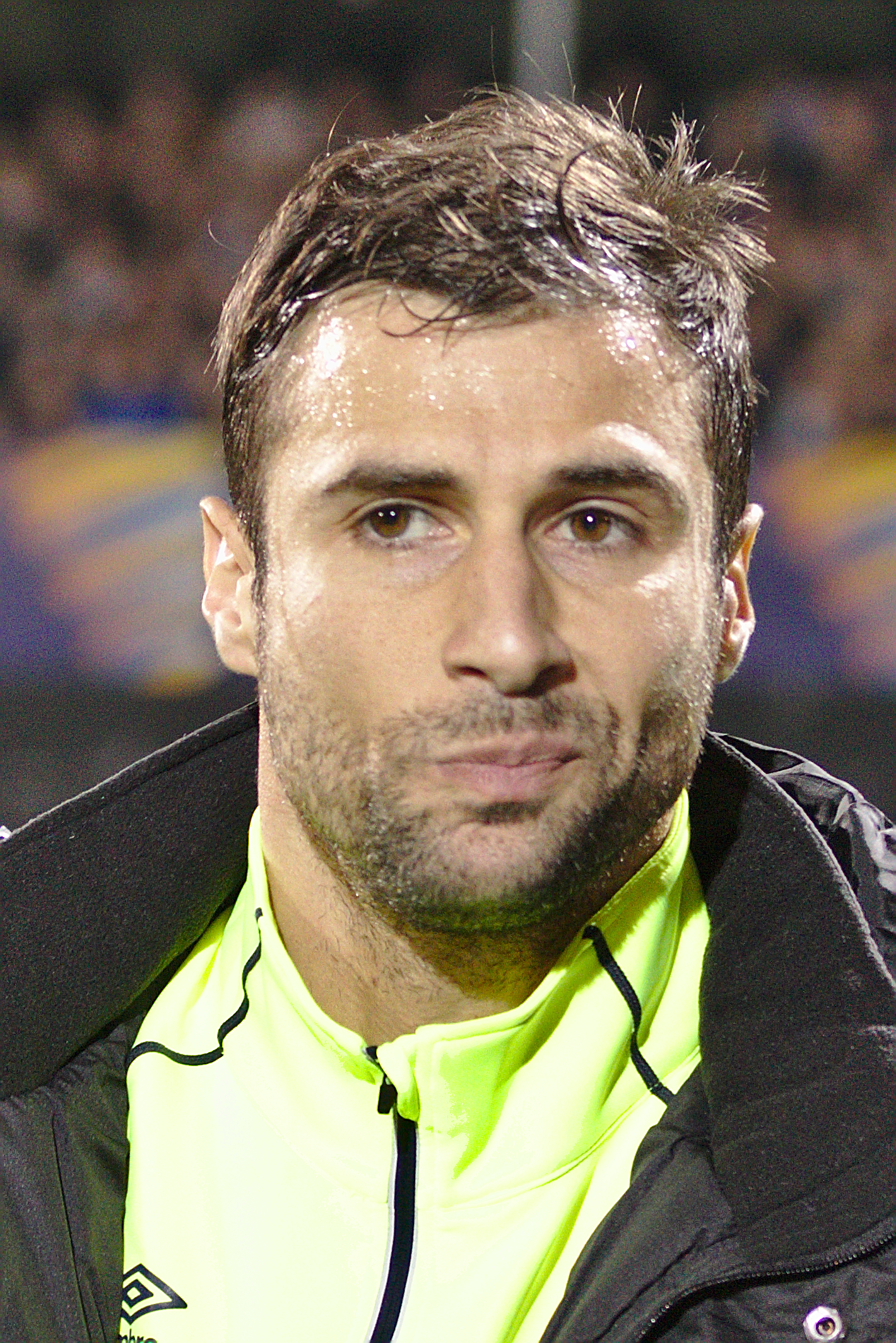
Cana

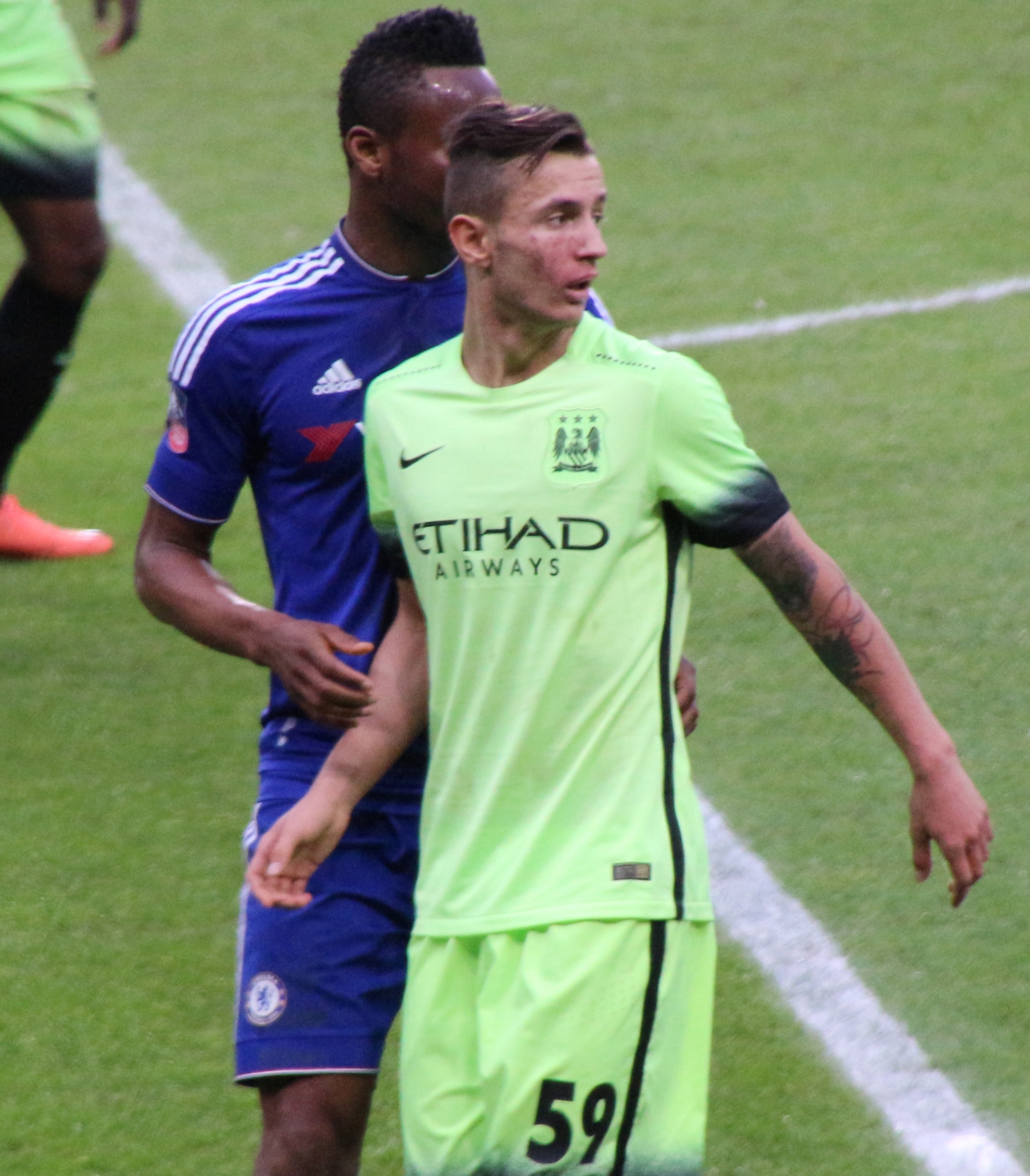
Celina

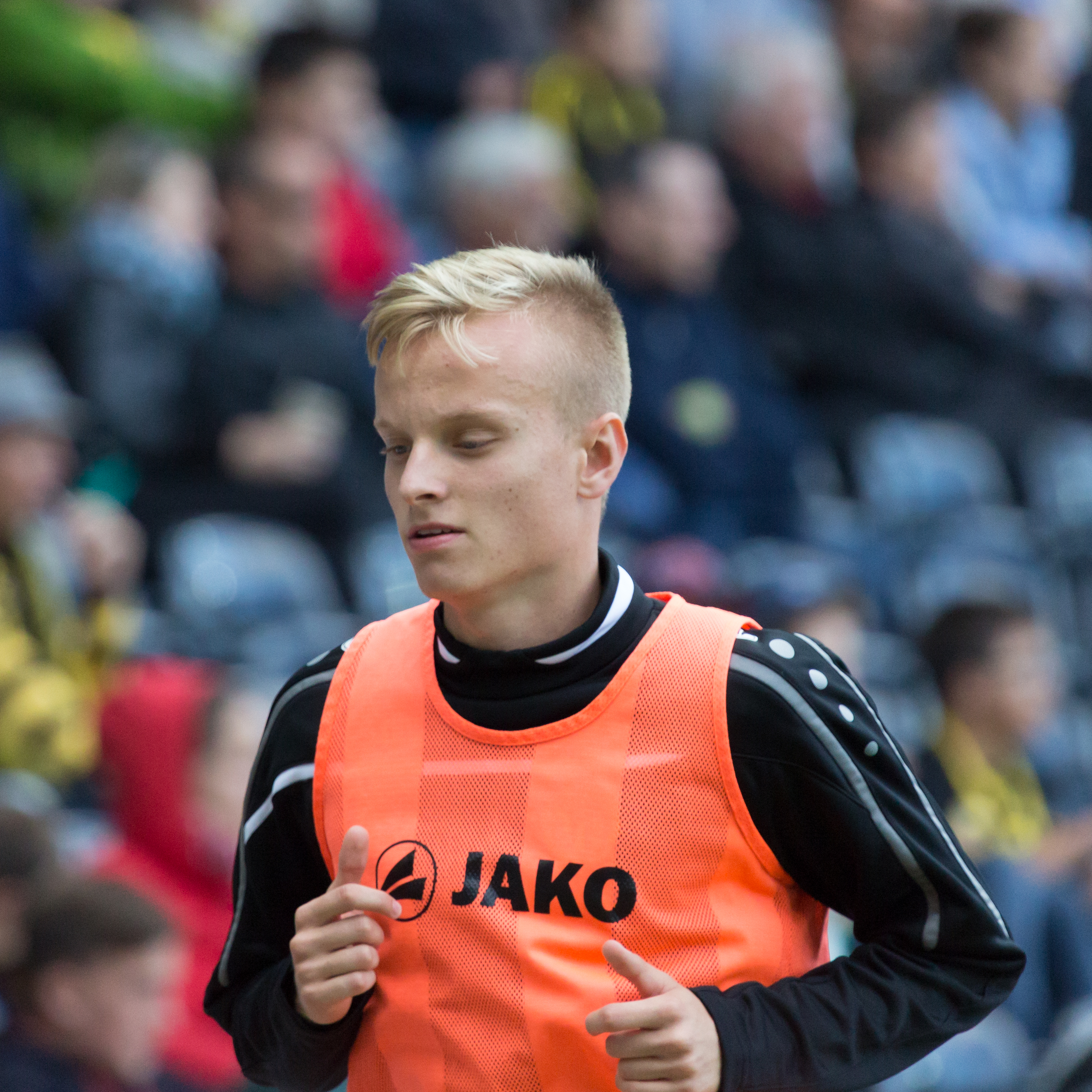
Hadergjonaj

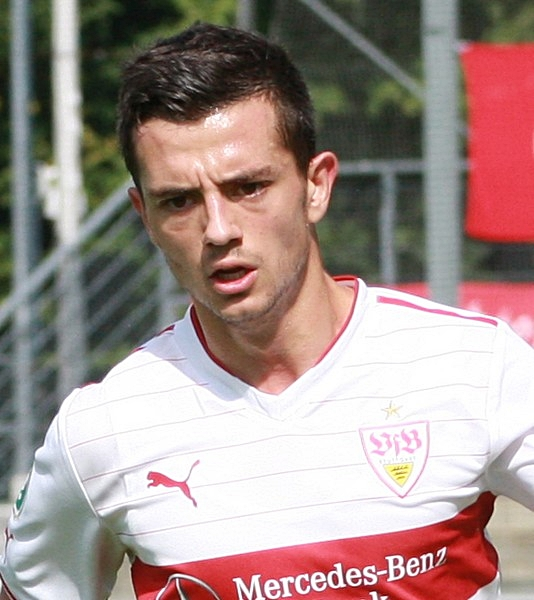
Halimi

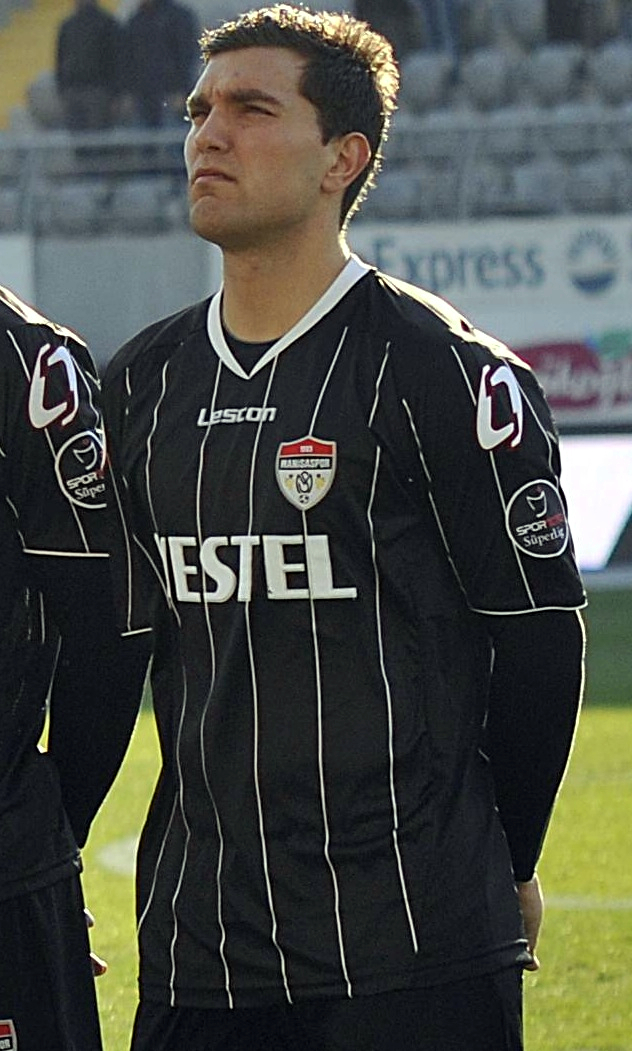
Harbuzi

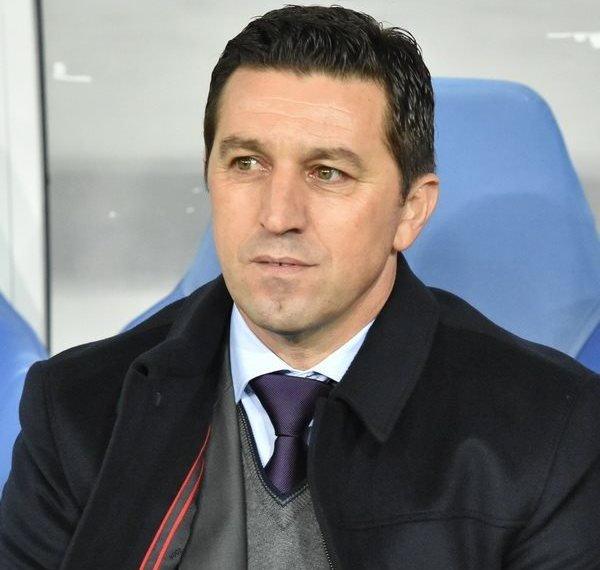
Hasi

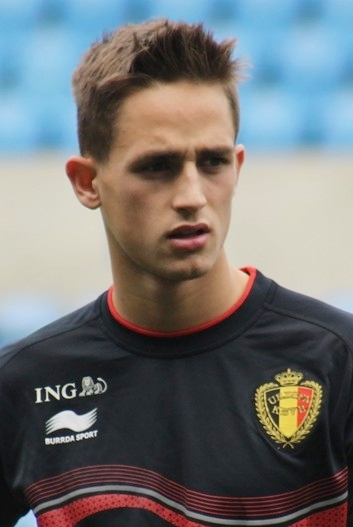
Januzaj

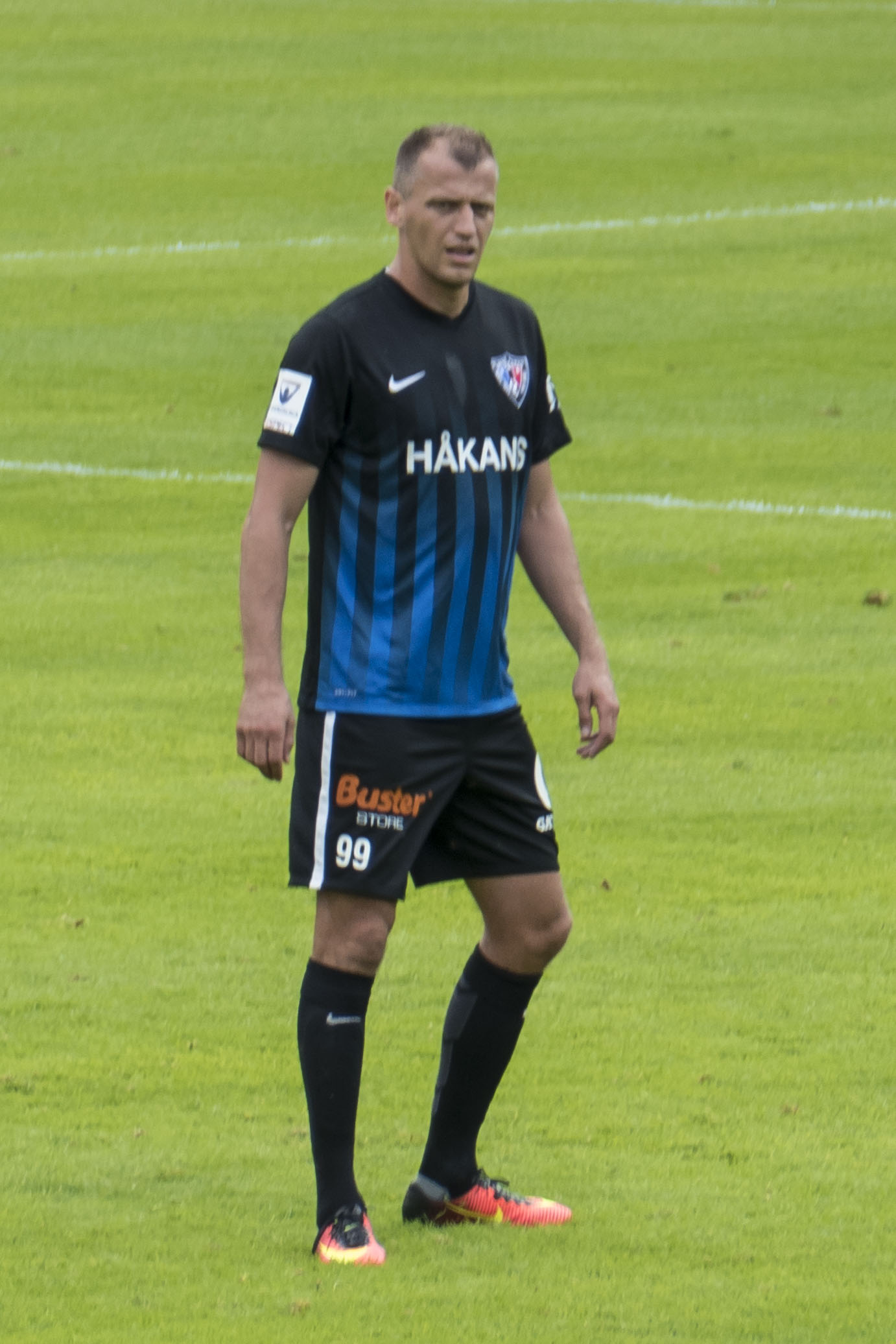
N. Kuqi

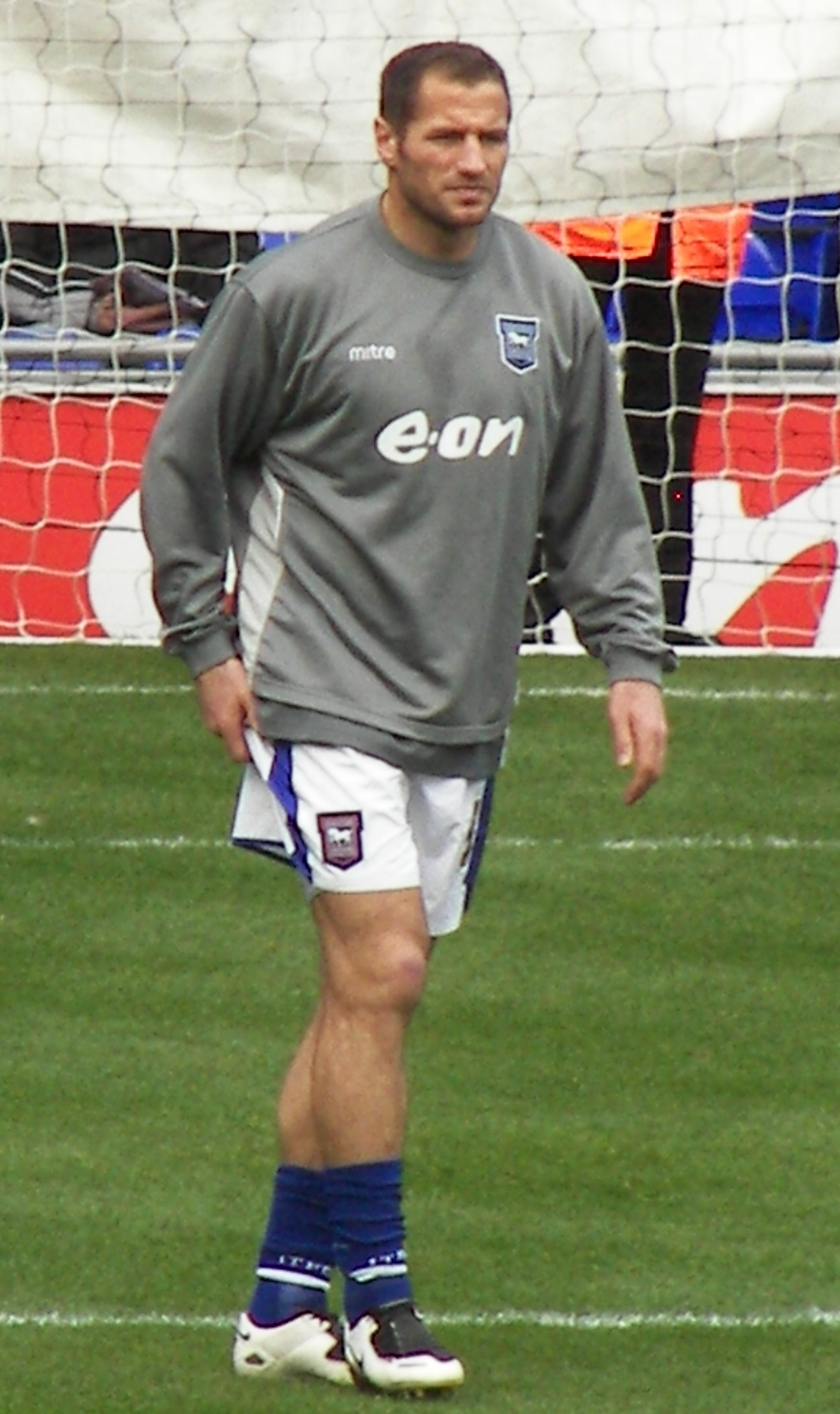
S. Kuqi

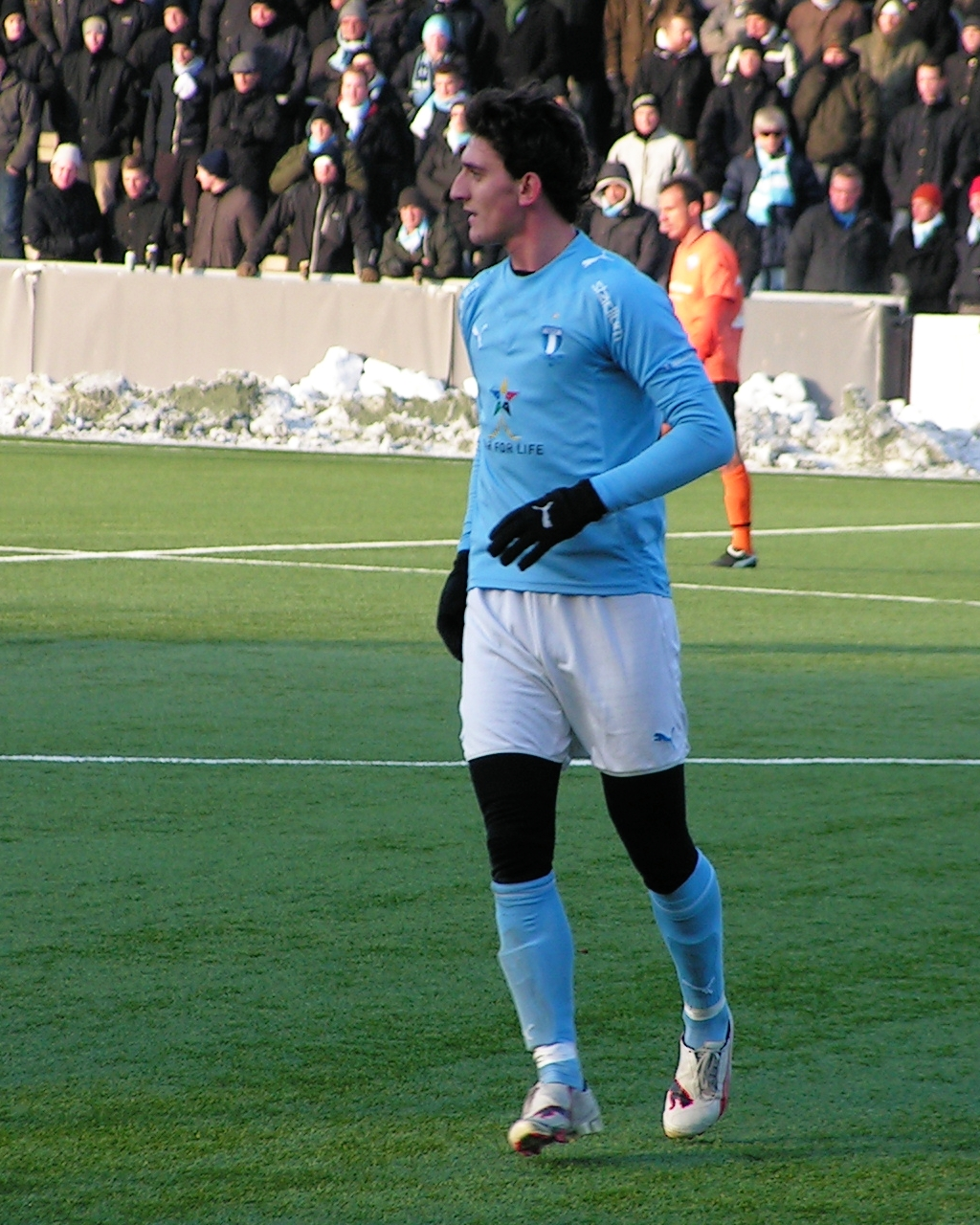
Mehmeti

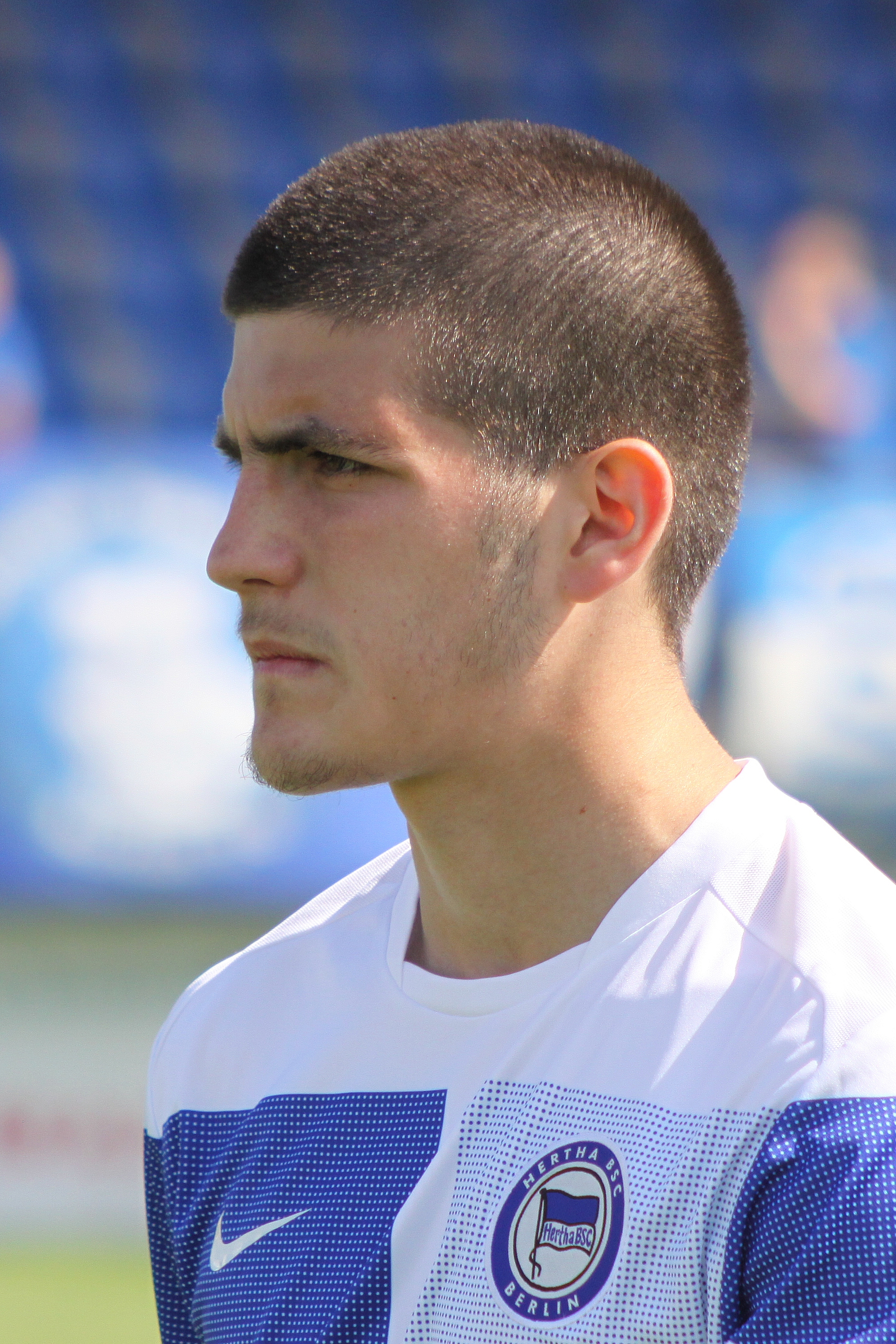
Përdedaj

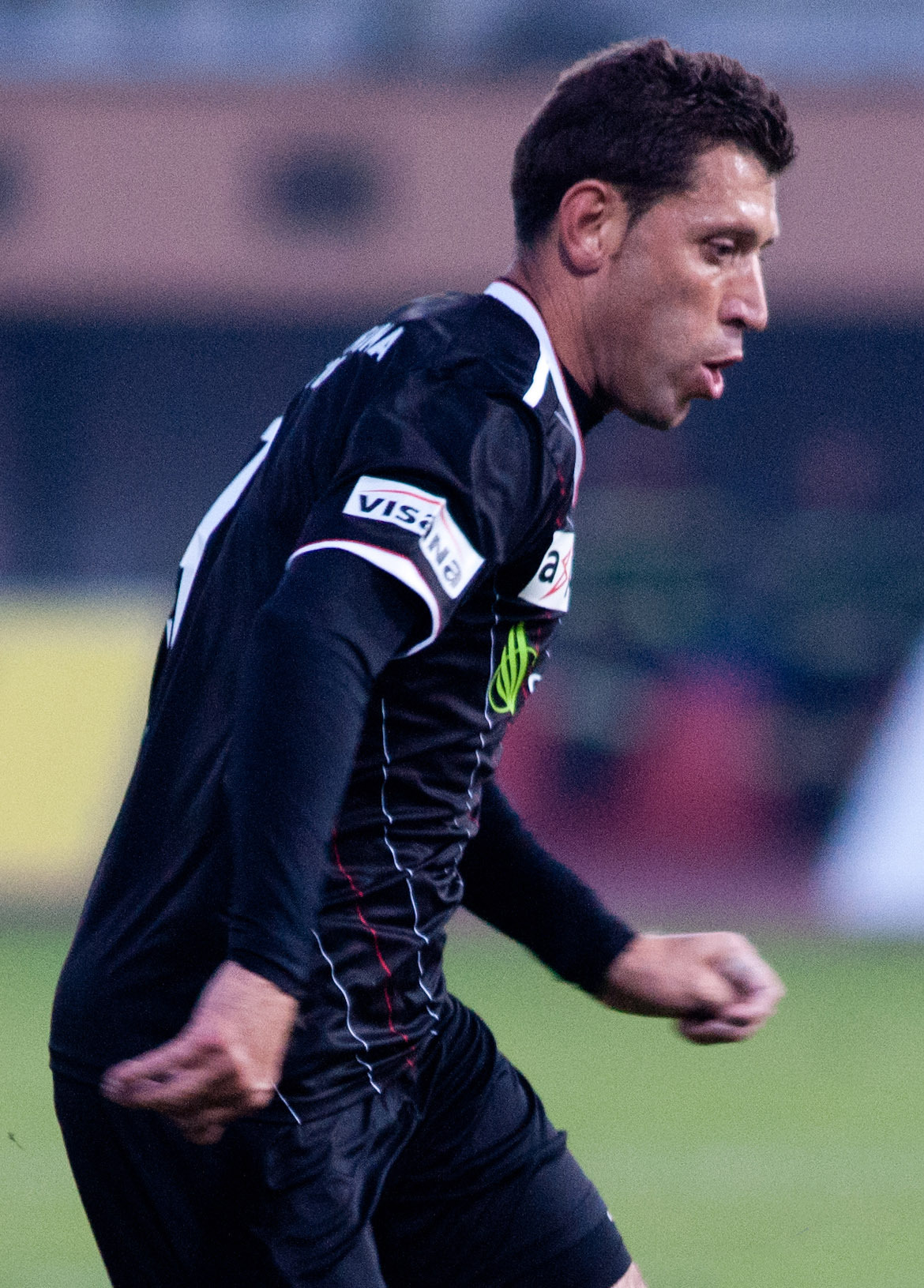
M. Rama

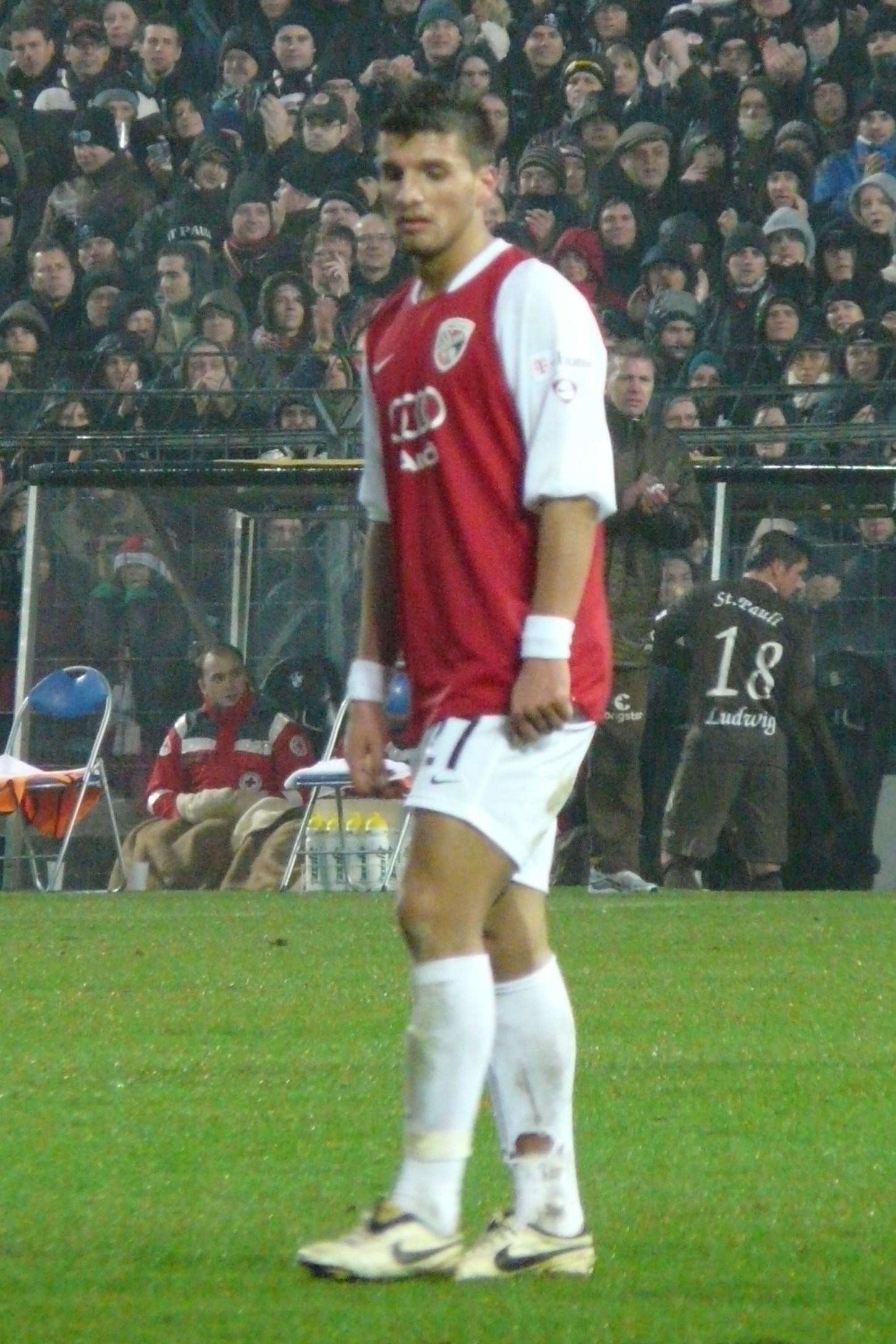
V. Rama

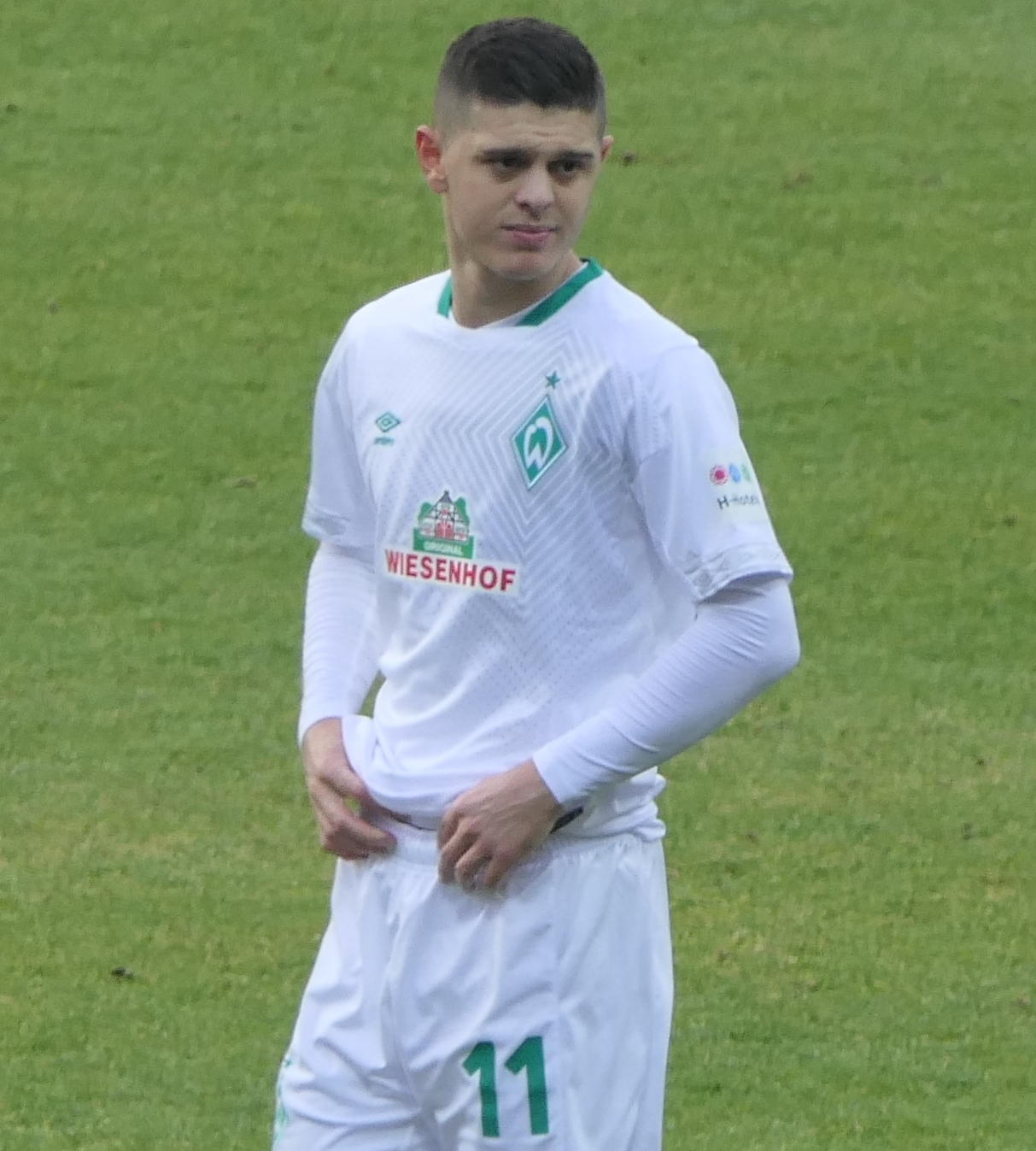
Rashica

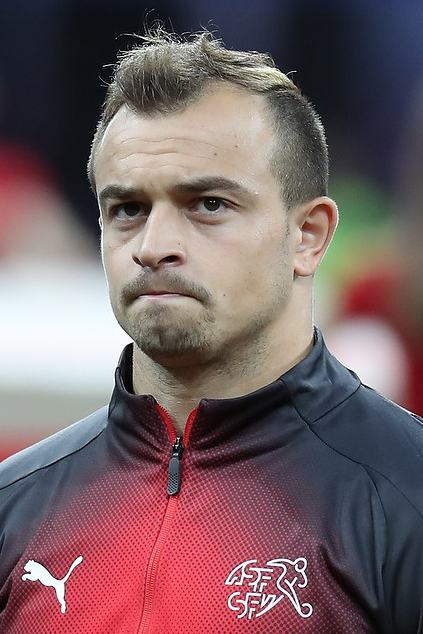
Shaqiri

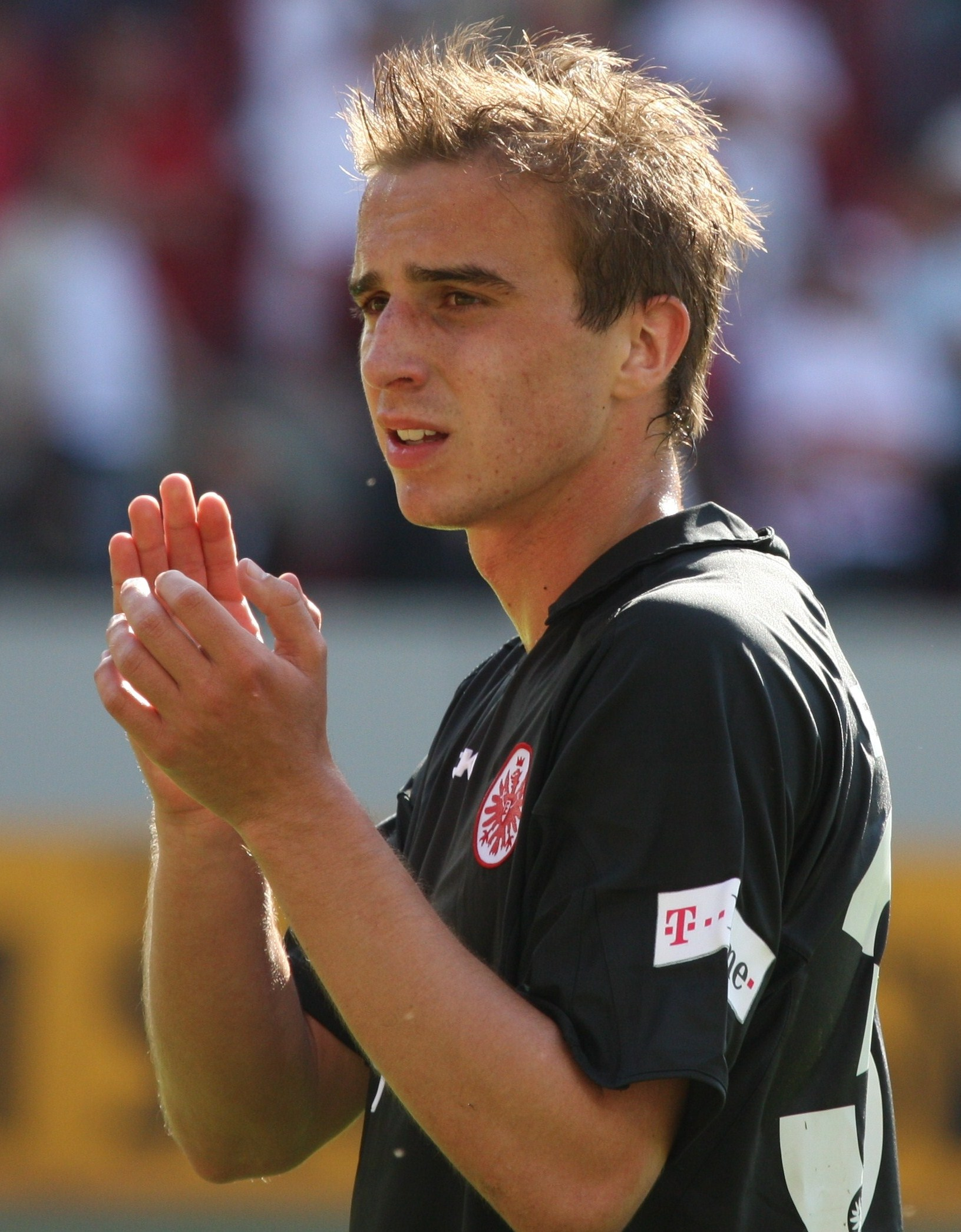
Toski

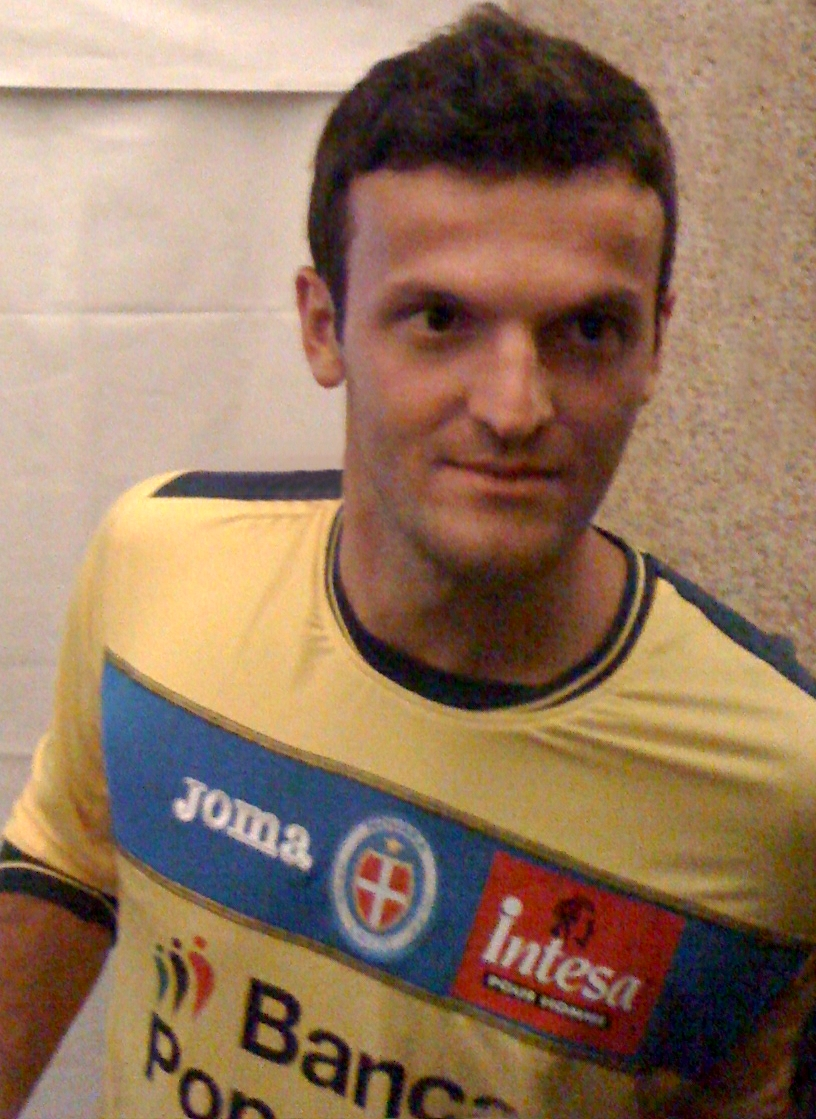
Ujkani

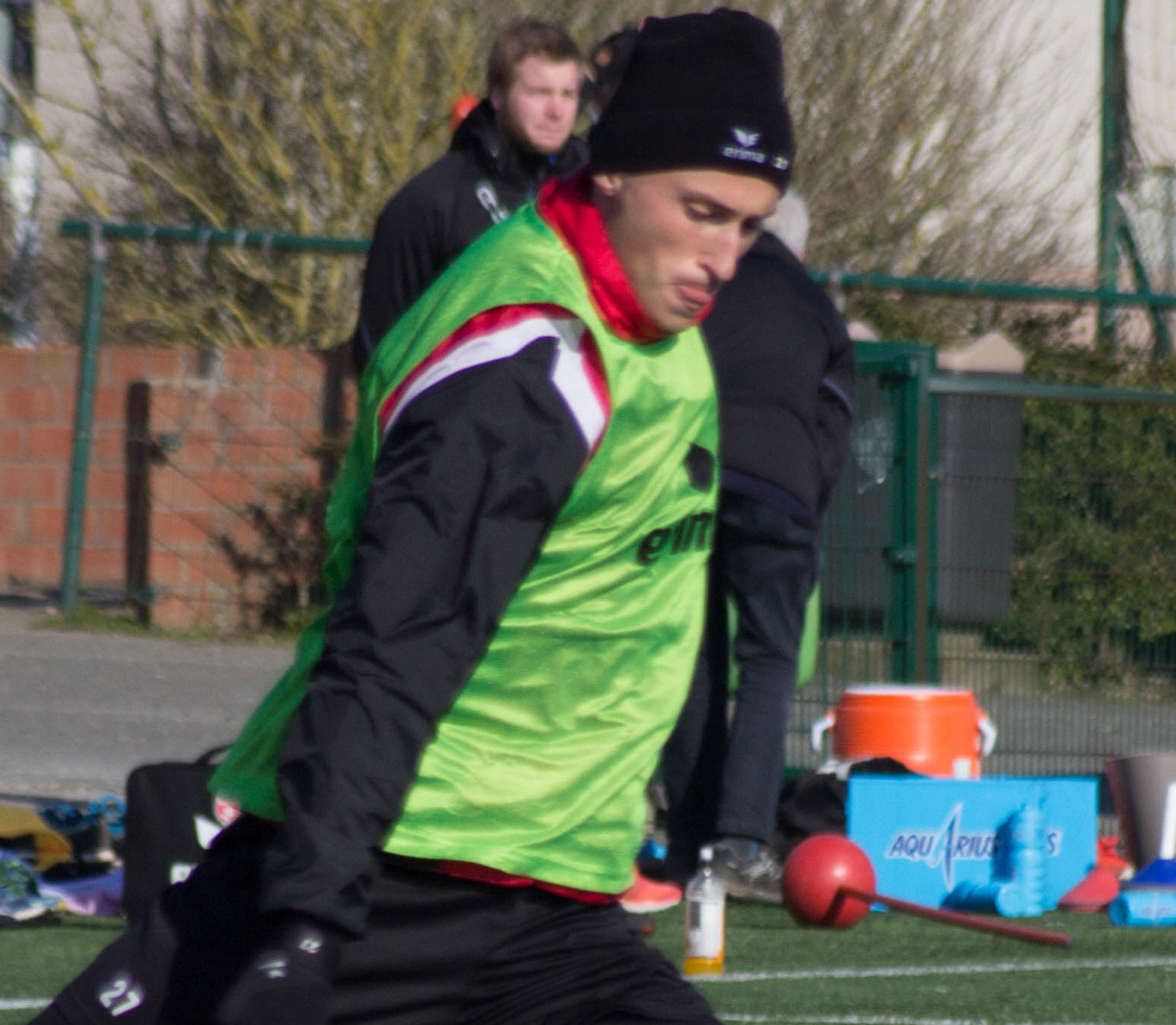
Vojvoda

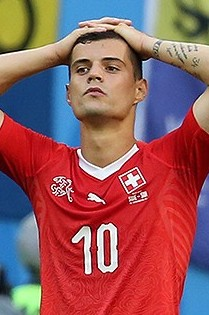
Xhaka

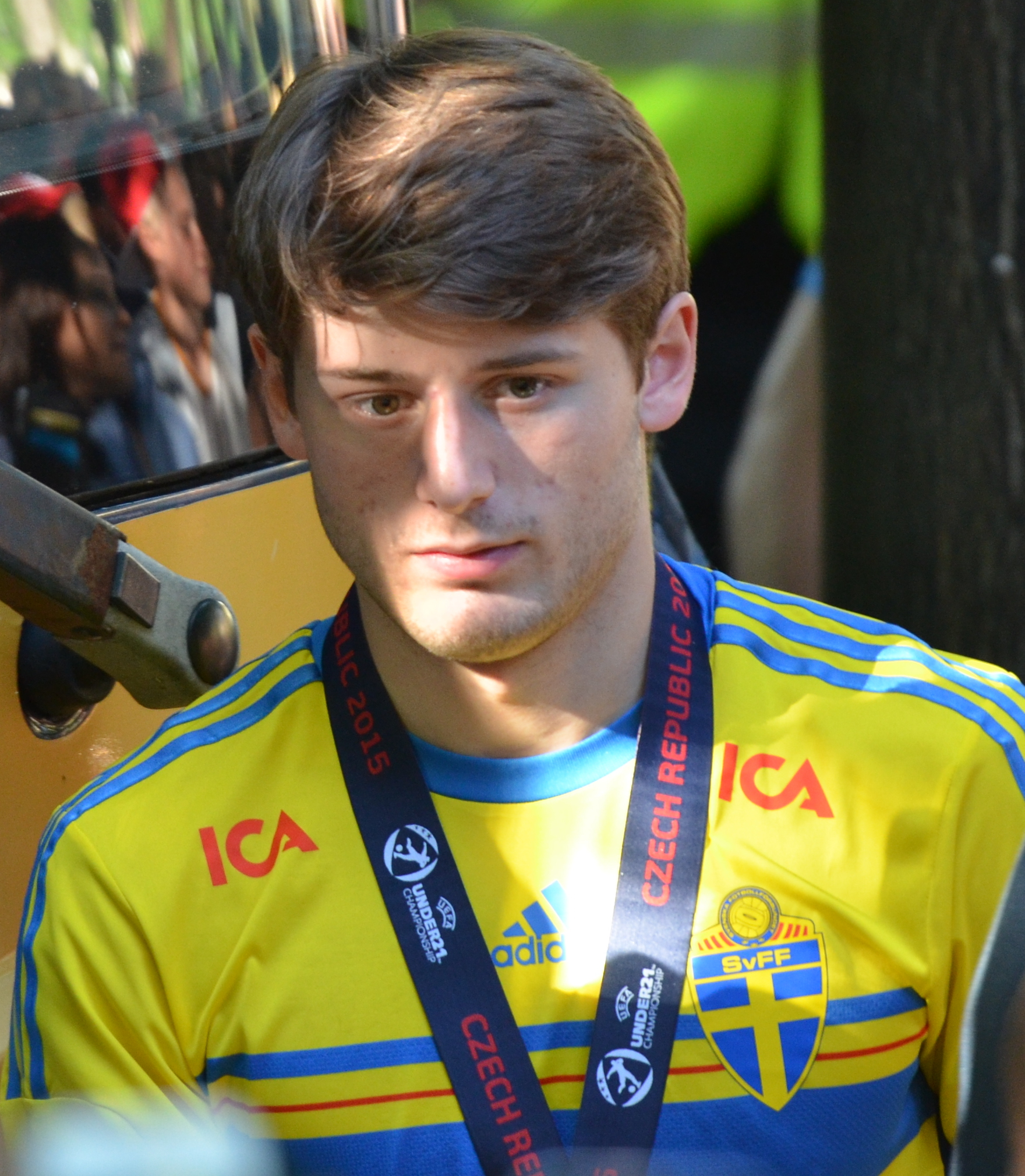
Zeneli

=== Basketball ===
- Edmond Azemi - Kosovo Albanian professional basketball player who plays for Sigal Prishtina in Kosovo Basketball Superleague

=== Handball ===
- Taip Ramadani - head coach of the Australian national handball team, parents are from Kosovo

Ice Hockey

• Arber Xhekaj - Defenseman for the NHL’s Montreal Canadiens; father is from Kosovo

=== American football ===
- Lirim Hajrullahu - Kosovar-born Canadian placekicker in both the CFL and NFL, 2017 Grey Cup champion

=== Boxing, kickboxing and wrestling ===
- Luan Krasniqi - German professional boxer, born in Junik
- Robin Krasniqi - German professional boxer, born in Junik
- Xhavit Bajrami - Swiss former kickboxer, born in Dumosh
- Aziz Salihu - professional boxer, born in Pristina
- Naim Terbunja - Swedish amateur boxer, born in Pristina
- Rezar - professional wrestler and former mixed martial artist
- Elvis Gashi - professional boxer in America, born in Peja
- Ilir Latifi - professional UFC fighter for Sweden, his parents come from Kosovo
- Elvir Muriqi - American-Albanian boxer, born in Kosovo
- Azem Maksutaj - Swiss former kickboxer, born in Kosovo
- Donjeta Sadiku - Kosovar female boxer, born in Pristina
- Besar Nimani - former professional boxer, IBF European intercontinental champion
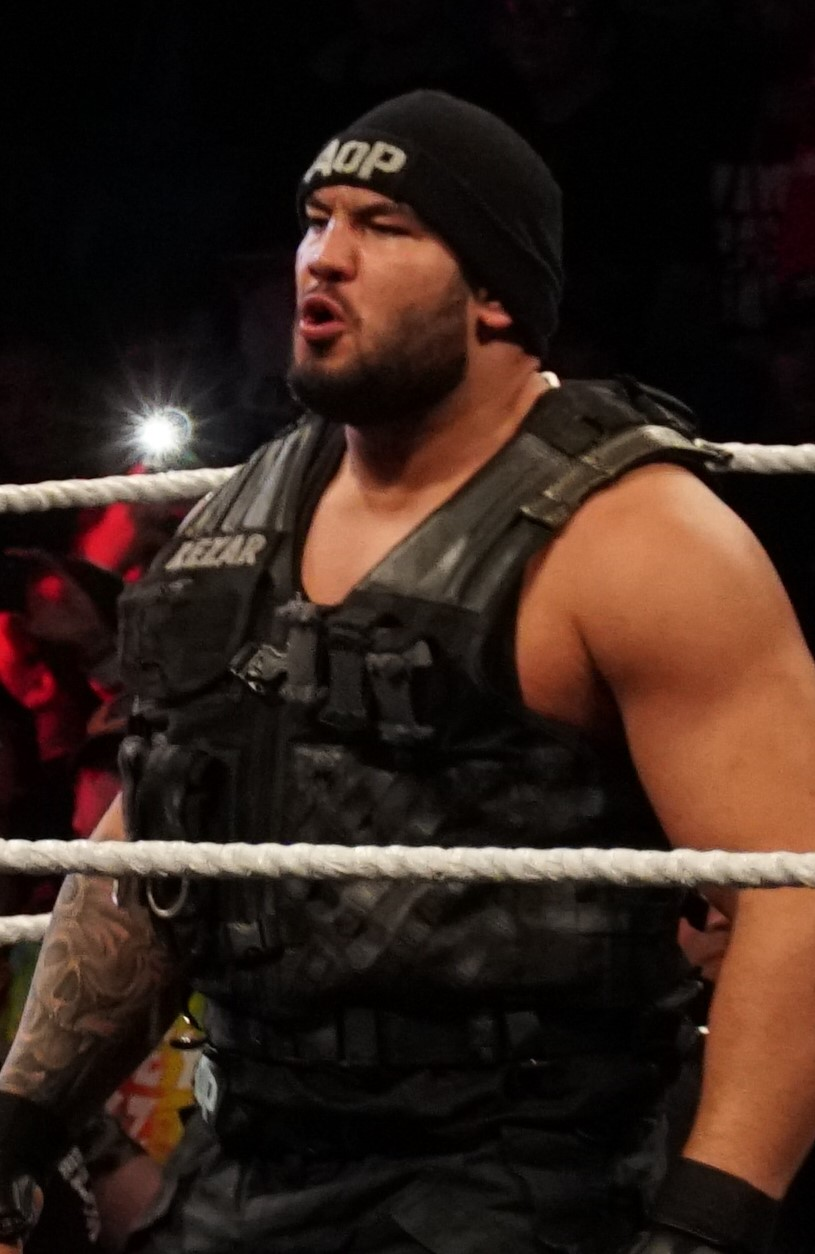
Rezar

=== Judo ===
- Majlinda Kelmendi - Judoka, 2013 and 2014 World Champion (52 kg), won the 2019 European Games, three European Championships (2014, 2016, 2017), the 2013 Judo World Masters, seven IJF Grand Slams, 10 IJF Grand Prix, and conquered the gold at the 2016 Summer Olympics
- Distria Krasniqi - Judoka, won three IJF World Masters (2018, 2019, 2021), two IJF Grand Slams (2020 Paris and Hungary), six IJF Grand Prix (2015 Samsun, 2017 Antalya and The Hague, 2018 Antalya and Tashkent, 2019 Antalya), one European Championship and a gold medal at the 2020 Summer Olympics
- Nora Gjakova - Judoka, won two IJF Grand Slams (2018, 2021), five IJF Grand Prix (2017 Antalya, 2018 Tunis, 2018 Antalya, 2019 Tbilisi), one European Championship, a gold medal at the 2018 Mediterranean Games, and conquered the gold at the 2020 Summer Olympics
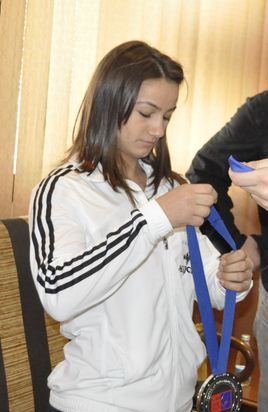
Kelmendi

== See also ==
- Albanian diaspora
- List of Albanian Americans
- List of Albanians in Serbia
- List of people from Pristina
- Lists of Albanians
