= Miss World Kosova =

Beauty pageant

- Formation: 2013
- Type: Beauty pageant
- Headquarters: Pristina
- Location: Kosovo
- Members: Miss World
- Official language: Albanian
- National Director: Agron Selimi
- Website: Official website

Miss World Kosova (Miss World Kosovo) is a national beauty pageant that sends representatives from Kosovo to the Miss World pageant. This pageant is not related to Miss Universe Kosovo pageant.

== History ==
On 4 April 2008, Fadil Berisha, Miss Universe’s official photographer, hosted Kosovo's inaugural pageant where Zana Krasniqi was crowned. She went on represent Kosovo at the Miss Universe pageant. This was the first appearance in a Miss Universe pageant for Miss Kosovo following the country's declaration of independence on February 17, 2008.

In 2013 Fadil Berisha and Agnesa Vutaj took control of Miss Kosovo and retrieved the Miss Universe franchise. This happened after the previous Miss Universe Kosovo director, Agron Selimi, and team made the decision to send their winner to Miss World. Thus, winners for the Miss Earth and Miss Universe pageant were held under a single pageant.

Nowadays, Miss World Kosova only sends its winner to the Miss World pageant.

== Titleholders ==
=== Miss World Kosova ===
Color key

- Declared as Winner
- Ended as runner-up
- Ended as one of the finalists or semifinalists

Year	Miss World Kosovo	Municipality	Placement	Special Awards
2013	Antigona Sejdiju	Pristina	Unplaced	
2014	Vita Rexhepi	Pristina	Unplaced	
2018	Reze Dautaj	Pristina	Did not compete	
2026	Marigona Musshabani	Gjakova	TBA	

== See also ==
- Miss Kosovo
- Miss Universe Kosovo
