= Donika Emini =

Kosovar beauty queen

- Born: Pristina, Kosovo
- Height: 1.80 m (5 ft 11 in)
- Beauty pageant titleholder
- Title: Miss Kosova Earth
- Major competitions: Miss Globe International 2011; Miss Earth 2013

Donika Emini is a Kosovar dancer, model and beauty pageant titleholder who was crowned as Miss Kosova Earth 2013 that gave her the right to represent Kosovo at Miss Earth 2013 pageant. She is the first Kosovan representative for Miss Earth from the said Fadil Berisha-Agnesa Vuthaj owned franchise.

== Biography ==
=== Miss Kosova 2013 ===
Emini joined the contest of Miss Kosova 2013. She won the title of Miss Kosova Earth 2013 together with Mirjeta Shala who won the title of Miss Universe Kosovo 2013.

=== Miss Earth 2013 ===
Emini was a contestant in the Miss Earth 2013 pageant which took place in the Philippines. She participated in all the pre-pageant activities but she was not able to get any medals as it was the basis of winning a particular activity. When the pageant concluded, Emini was not called to be part of the semi-finals where the Top 16 would advance to win the crown.

Awards and achievements
Preceded by Ajshe Babatinca	Miss Earth Kosovo; 2013	Succeeded by Kaltrina Neziri
