= Dragusha =

Dragusha is an Albanian surname. Notable people with the surname include:

- Alban Dragusha (born 1981), Kosovar footballer
- Marigona Dragusha (born 1990), Kosovar beauty pageant titleholder
- Mehmet Dragusha (born 1977), Kosovar footballer
