= Miss Universe Kosovo 2012 =

- Date: June 21, 2012
- Venue: National Theatre of Kosovo, Pristina, Kosovo
- Broadcaster: RTK
- Entrants: 20
- Winner: Diana Avdiu; Kosovo Polje

The Miss Universe Kosovo 2012 pageant was held on June 21, 2012. This year only 20 candidates were competing for the national crown. Each delegate represented a municipality of the country. Eventual winner, Diana Avdiu, represented Kosovo at Miss Universe 2012 placing in the Top 16 semifinalist. The Miss Earth Kosovo represented the country in Miss Earth 2012 without placing. The Miss Supranational Kosovo represented the country in Miss Supranational 2012 without placing.

== Final results ==
Final results	Candidate
Miss Universe Kosovo 2012	Kosovo Polje - Diana Avdiu
Miss Earth Kosovo	Rahovec - Ajshe Babatinca
Miss Supranational Kosovo	Viti - Arselajda Buraku
First Runner-up	Lipjan - Liridona Miftari
Second Runner-up	Deçan - Elga Shala
Third Runner-up	Skënderaj - Arbesa Fetahi
Top 12 Semi-finalists	Gjilan - Nebahate Fazliu; Podujevë - Leonora Xhemajlaj; Pristina - Anisa Berisha; Kryeqyteti - Valentina Ahmeti; Štrpce - Donika Pasjaqa; Zvečan - Narta Jashanica

=== Special awards ===
- Best National Costume - Fijona Rama (Kaçanik)
- Miss Congeniality (voted by the candidates) - Elga Shala (Deçan)
- Miss Elegance - Nebahate Fazliu (Gjilan)
- Miss Internet - Diana Avdiu (Kosovo Polje)
- Miss Model - Donika Pasjaqa (Štrpce)
- Miss Photogenic - Leonora Xhemajlaj (Podujevë)
- Miss Press - Diana Avdiu (Kosovo Polje)

== Official delegates ==
Municipality	Contestant	Age	Height	Hometown
Deçan	Elga Shala	19	1.78 m (5 ft 10 in)	Gjakova
Gjakova	Saranda Hoxha	21	1.83 m (6 ft 0 in)	Gjakova
Gjilan	Nebahate Fazliu	22	1.82 m (5 ft 11 1/2 in)	Gjilan
Kaçanik	Fijona Rama	24	1.73 m (5 ft 8 in)	Kosovo Polje
Kamenica	Marigona Isufi	19	1.78 m (5 ft 10 in)	Kamenica
Klina	Ernita Arifaj	27	1.85 m (6 ft 1 in)	Peja
Kosovo Polje	Diana Avdiu	19	1.76 m (5 ft 9 1/2 in)	Kosovo Polje
Kryeqyteti	Valentina Ahmeti	18	1.81 m (5 ft 11 1/2 in)	Pristina
Lipjan	Liridona Miftari	20	1.74 m (5 ft 8 1/2 in)	Lipjan
Mitrovica	Arjeta Dragaj	19	1.73 m (5 ft 8 in)	Skënderaj
Peja	Agnesa Gashi	20	1.80 m (5 ft 11 in)	Peja
Podujevë	Leonora Xhemajlaj	26	1.73 m (5 ft 8 in)	Pristina
Pristina	Anisa Berisha	21	1.83 m (6 ft 0 in)	Pristina
Prizreni	Rezarta Kelani	20	1.75 m (5 ft 9 in)	Pristina
Rahovec	Ajshe Babatinca	18	1.76 m (5 ft 9 1/2 in)	Pristina
Štrpce	Donika Pasjaqa	20	1.85 m (6 ft 1 in)	Štrpce
Skënderaj	Arbesa Fetahi	20	1.84 m (6 ft 1/2 in)	Skënderaj
Viti	Arselajda Buraku	19	1.78 m (5 ft 10 in)	Pristina
Vushtrri	Elizabet Vishki	24	1.73 m (5 ft 8 in)	Vushtrri
Zvečan	Narta Jashanica	18	1.79 m (5 ft 10 1/2 in)	Pristina

== See also ==
- Miss Universe Kosovo
