= List of people from Pristina =

The following are notable people who were either born, raised or have lived for a significant period of time in Pristina.

== List ==
- Aida Baraku, Kosovo-Albanian singer, composer, journalist and producer
- Albin Kurti, Kosovo-Albanian politician and activist
- Ardian Bujupi Kosovo-Albanian singer and songwriter
- Behgjet Pacolli, Kosovo-Albanian politician and businessman
- Burim Myftiu, Kosovo-Albanian Visual Artist, Curator and Photographer
- Dragan Tomić, Serbian politician, served as the president of the National Assembly of Serbia from 1994 to 2001
- Dua Lipa, Kosovo-Albanian singer and songwriter
- Edon Zhegrova, football Kosovo-Albanian player
- Enver Petrovci, Kosovo-Albanian actor, writer and director
- Gazmend Pula, A intellectual, human rights campaigner, and ambassador
- Glauk Konjufca, Albanian politician
- Goran Đorović, former Serbian football player
- Hajdar Dushi, Kosovo-Albanian partisan and national hero of Yugoslavia and Albania
- Jana, Serbian singer
- Kadri Prishtina, Kosovo-Albanian politician and activist
- Kenan Sipahi, former Turkish basketball player
- Lorik Cana, Kosovo-albanian. Former professional football player
- Marigona Dragusha, Kosovo-Albanian model
- Marko Simonović, former Serbian basketball player
- Milena Rašić, former Serbian volleyball player and Olympic medalist
- Nikola Markov, Bulgarian from the Macedonian-Adrianopolitan Volunteer Corps during the Balkan wars (1912-1913)
- Rasta, Serbian rapper
- Rita Ora, Kosovo-Albanian singer and songwriter
- Sava Petrović-Grmija, Serbian soldier, member of the Serbian Chetnik Organization and participant in the Balkan Wars and World War I
- Shkëlzen Shala, Kosovo-Albanian entrepreneur and veganism activist
- Shpend Ahmeti, Kosovo-Albanian politician
- Tony Dovolani, Kosovo-Albanian-American dancer and instructor
- Zana Krasniqi, Kosovo-Albanian model
- Zoran Radosavljević, Serbian major and fighter pilot
- Zufer Avdija, Serbian–Israeli basketball coach and former basketball player
- Ejup Maqedonci, Minister of Defense
