= Kaltrina Neziri =

Kosovar model

- Born: Pristina, Kosovo
- Height: 1.75 m (5 ft 9 in)
- Beauty pageant titleholder
- Title: Miss Kosova Earth
- Hair color: Dark Brown/Black
- Eye color: Dark Brown/Black
- Major competitions: Miss Kosova Earth 2014 (Winner); Miss Earth 2015 (Unplaced)

Kaltrina Neziri is a Kosovar model and beauty pageant titleholder who was crowned as Miss Kosova Earth 2014 and competed in Miss Earth 2015.

== Pageantry ==
=== Miss Kosova 2014 ===
Kaltrina won the title of Miss Earth Kosova 2014 and becomes Donika Emini's successor.

=== Miss Earth 2015 ===
By winning Miss Earth Kosovo, Kaltrina will represent Kosovo at Miss Earth 2015 pageant. However, she is unplaced on that pageant.

Awards and achievements
Preceded by Donika Emini	Miss Earth Kosovo; 2014	Succeeded by Incumbent
