= Afërdita Dreshaj =

Albanian-American singer and model (born 1986)

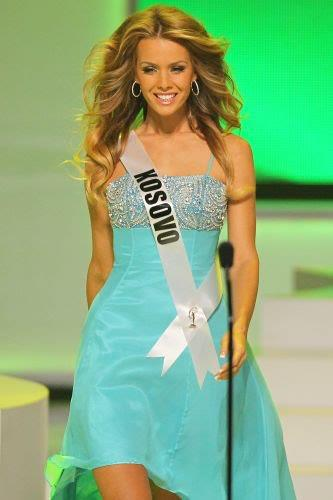
- Dreshaj at Miss Universe 2011 in São Paulo, Brazil
- Born: 19 July 1986 (age 40); Titograd, SR Montenegro, SFR Yugoslavia
- Beauty pageant titleholder
- Title: Miss Universe Kosovo 2011
- Major competitions: Miss Universe Kosovo 2011 (Winner); Miss Universe 2011 (Top 16)

Afërdita Dreshaj (Albanian: [afəɾˈdita drɛˈʃaj]; born 19 July 1986) is an Albanian-American singer, model and beauty pageant titleholder who was crowned as Miss Universe Kosovo 2011. Dreshaj represented the nation at the Miss Universe 2011 pageant and finished among the top 16.

== Life and career ==
=== 1986–2011: Early life and Miss Universe Kosovo ===
Afërdita Dreshaj was born on 19 July 1986 into an Albanian family in the city of Titograd, Yugoslavia (present-day Podgorica, Montenegro). In January 2011, Dreshaj was crowned as Miss Universe Kosovo and the nation's representative at the Miss Universe 2011 pageant. Held in São Paulo, Brazil, Dreshaj advanced from a total of 89 contestants into semi-finals of Miss Universe 2011 finishing among the top 16.

== Personal life ==
She began her career as a model at age 17, upon being discovered by a photographer. She was previously engaged to the Albanian singer Shpat Kasapi. Dreshaj currently lives in the U.S., with her husband, the Czech ice hockey defenseman Jakub Kindl

Awards and achievements
Preceded by Kështjella Pepshi	Miss Universe Kosovo; 2011	Succeeded by Diana Avdiu
