= Miss Universe Kosovo =

National beauty pageant competition in Kosovo

Miss Kosova Organization
- Formation: 2008; 18 years ago
- Type: Beauty pageant
- Headquarters: Pristina
- Location: Kosovo
- Members: Miss Universe; Miss Earth
- Official language: Albanian
- President: Eduart Deda
- Website: misskosova.info

The Miss Universe Kosovo is a national beauty pageant that sends representatives from Kosovo to the Miss Universe pageant.

== History ==
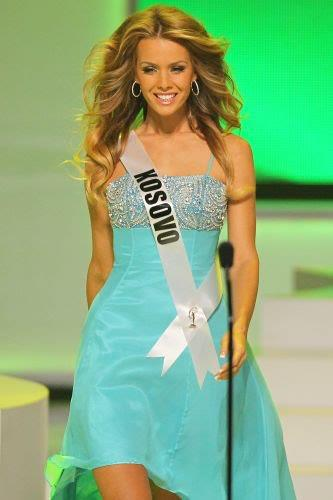
Aferdita Dreshaj, Miss Universe Kosovo 2011/ Top 16 in Miss Universe 2011.

On 4 April 2008 Fadil Berisha - photographer of Miss Universe's official photos - hosted Kosova's inaugural pageant where Zana Krasniqi was crowned. She went on represent Kosova at the Miss Universe pageant. This was the first appearance in a Miss Universe pageant for Miss Kosova following the country's declaration of independence on February 17, 2008.

In 2013 Fadil Berisha and Agnesa Vuthaj took control of Miss Kosovo and retrieved the Miss Universe franchise. This happened after the previous Miss Universe Kosovo director, Agron Selimi and team made the decision to send their winner to Miss World. Thus, winners for Miss Earth and Miss Universe pageant is being held under single pageant.

In 2018 Revista VIP Club took over the franchise of Miss Universe in Kosovo under the direction of TV producer Labinot Gashi. The company also holds the franchise for Miss Universe in Albania.

== Titleholders ==
The following is a list of winners. From 2008 to present.

Year	Miss Kosova	Municipality
2008	Zana Krasniqi	Pristina
2009	Marigona Dragusha	Pristina
2010	Kështjella Pepshi	Pristina
2011	Afërdita Dreshaj	Pristina
2012	Diana Avdiu	Pristina
2013	Mirjeta Shala	Vučitrn
2014	Artnesa Krasniqi	Pristina
2016	Camila Barraza	Pristina
2018	Zana Berisha	Ferizaj
2019	Fatbardha Hoxha	Suva Reka
2020	Blerta Veseli	Gjilan
2021	Tuti Sejdiu	Gjilan
2022	Roksana Ibrahimi	Pristina
2023	Arbesa Rrahmani	Ferizaj
2024	Edona Bajrami	Pristina
2025	Dorea Shala	Lincoln
2026	TBA	TBA

== Titleholders under Miss Universe Kosovo org. ==
=== Miss Universe Kosovo ===
- : Declared as Winner
- : Ended as runner-up or top 5/6 qualification
- : Ended as one of the finalists or semifinalists
- : Ended as special awards winner

The first titleholder in Zana Krasniqi who eventually placed as a Top 10 finalist at the 2008 Miss Universe pageant. She is the first ever Kosovar woman to enter and place in the contest, finishing 6th, just two tenths of a point from the top five. The following year turned out to be another success for the Miss Universe Kosovo pageant: Marigona Dragusha, known as "Gona Dragusha", placed second runner-up to Miss Universe 2009 in the Bahamas making her to be the first delegate from Kosovo to make it top the top five. In terms of placements, Kosovo has been one of the most successful entrants into the Miss Universe pageant. The winner of Miss Kosovo represents her country at Miss Universe. On occasion, when the winner does not qualify (due to age) for either contest, a runner-up is sent.

Year	Municipality	Miss Kosovo	Placement at Miss Universe	Special awards	Notes
Eduart Dedaj directorship — a franchise holder to Miss Universe from 2018
2026	Toronto	Evisa Pacolli	TBA	TBA	
2025	Lincoln	Dorea Shala	Unplaced		
2024	Pristina	Edona Bajrami	Did not compete		
2023	Ferizaj	Arbesa Rrahmani	Unplaced		
2022	Pristina	Roksana Ibrahimi	Unplaced		
2021	Gjilan	Tuti Sejdiu	Unplaced		
2020	Gjilan	Blerta Veseli	Unplaced		
2019	Suva Reka	Fatbardha Hoxha	Unplaced		
2018	Ferizaj	Zana Berisha	Unplaced		
Agnesa Vuthaj directorship — a franchise holder to Miss Universe between 2013―2016
Did not compete in 2017
2016	Pristina	Camila Barraza	Unplaced		The first Argentinian-Albanian who won Miss Kosova.
2015	Vushtrri	Mirjeta Shala	Unplaced		Did not compete in 2013, due to political issues; Mirjeta allocated to Miss Universe 2015.
2014	Pristina	Artnesa Krasniqi	Unplaced		
Agron Selimi directorship — a franchise holder to Miss Universe between 2008―2012
Did not compete in 2013
2012	Pristina	Diana Avdiu	Top 16	Miss Photogenic	
2011	Pristina	Afërdita Dreshaj	Top 16		Singer within Albanian-speaking countries.
2010	Pristina	Keshtjela Pepsi	Unplaced		Grew up in Bern, Switzerland, where she competed in the Miss Bern beauty pageant.
2009	Pristina	Marigona Dragusha	2nd Runner-up		
2008	Pristina	Zana Krasniqi	Top 10	Best National Costume (Top 10)	Miss Kosova — Agron Selimi directorship; a background of entertainers including her father Naim Krasniqi, a singer in Kosovo.

=== Miss Earth Kosovo ===
- : Declared as Winner
- : Ended as runner-up or top 5/6 qualification
- : Ended as one of the finalists or semifinalists
- : Ended as special awards winner

The first delegate for Miss Earth from Kosovo is Mirjeta Zeka in 2002. She is the first delegate from Kosovo to join in a major beauty pageant while Kosovo was still then part of Yugoslavia or Serbia. However, as when the pageant concluded, she went home unplaced. The organization responsible for sending a delegate to Miss Earth was a different organization in 2002 and in 2003. It was in 2007 when Agnesa Vuthaj acquired the franchise and sent Miss Kosovo 2007 winner, Yllka Berisha, to Miss Earth 2008. However, she was unable to grab a spot in the semifinals as well. In 2014, Kaltrina Neziri was supposed to compete for Miss Earth but her visa was denied and was not able to compete. The organizer decided that she would compete for the following year, instead. To date, there is yet a Kosovan delegate to place in the Miss Earth pageant. One of the runners-up of Miss Kosovo represents her country at Miss Earth.

Year	Municipality	Miss Earth Kosovo	Placement at Miss Earth	Special awards	Notes
Eduart Dedaj directorship — a franchise holder to Miss Earth from 2022
2024	Mannheim	Eltina Thaqi	Unplaced		
2023	Pristina	Leonora Leci	Unplaced		
2022	Gjakova	Vonesa Alijaj	Unplaced		
Agnesa Vuthaj directorship — a franchise holder to Miss Earth between 2013―2016
Did not compete between 2017—2021
2016	Gjakova	Andina Pura	Did not compete		
2015	Pristina	Kaltrina Neziri	Unplaced	(bronze) Evening Gown Competition	Allocated to 2015, she was crowned in 2014.
Did not compete in 2014
2013	Pristina	Donika Emini	Unplaced		
Miss Earth Kosova/Miss Kosova (regional selection) directorship — a franchise holder to Miss Earth between 2002―2012
2012	Pristina	Ajshe Babatinca	Unplaced		
2011	Pristina	Nora Asani	Unplaced		
2010	Peja	Morena Taraku	Unplaced		
2009	Pristina	Elsa Marku	Unplaced		
2008	Pristina	Yllka Berisha	Unplaced		
Did not compete between 2004—2007
2003	Pristina	Teuta Hoxha	Unplaced		
2002	Pristina	Mirjeta Zeka	Unplaced		

== Past titleholders under Miss Universe Kosovo org. ==
=== Miss World Kosovo ===
- : Declared as Winner
- : Ended as runner-up or top 5/6 qualification
- : Ended as one of the finalists or semifinalists
- : Ended as special awards winner

Began 2018, one of the runners-up of Miss Kosovo represents her country at Miss World.

Year	Municipality	Miss World Kosovo	Placement at Miss World	Special awards	Notes
Eduart Dedaj directorship — a franchise holder to Miss World in 2018
Did not compete since 2019—Present
2018	Pristina	Reze Dautaj	Did not compete		
Agron Selimi directorship — a franchise holder to Miss World between 2013―2014
Did not compete between 2015—2017
2014	Pristina	Vita Rexhepi	Unplaced		
2013	Pristina	Antigona Sejdiju	Unplaced		

== Notes ==
In 2013 the former Miss Universe Kosovo team pulled out of Miss Universe and decided to send their winning girl to Miss World 2013. Instead Fadil Berisha held a separate Miss Universe Kosovo edition in which Mirjeta Shala was crowned. However, in October Kosovo withdrew from the Miss Universe 2013 pageant because the security of Kosovo's contestant could not be assured in Russia and also Russia's non-recognition of the Kosovo's independence and passport.

== See also ==
- Miss Kosovo
- Miss Albania
- Miss Universe Albania
- Miss Universe Kosovo 2012
