= Zana Berisha =

Kosovar model

- Born: 1995 (age 30–31); Suva Reka, FR Yugoslavia (modern Kosovo)
- Height: 1.68 m (5 ft 6 in)
- Beauty pageant titleholder
- Title: Miss Kosovo 2018
- Hair color: Black
- Eye color: Green
- Major competitions: Miss Kosovo 2018 (Winner); Miss Universe 2018 (Unplaced)

Zana Berisha (born 1995) is a Kosovar model and beauty pageant titleholder who won Miss Kosovo 2018 on June 29, 2018. She represented Kosovo at Miss Universe 2018 pageant.

== Personal life ==
Berisha was born and raised in the town of Suhareka, Kosovo. Later on due to her modelling career she decided to live in the capital city of Pristina. She works as a model, also under the focus of the photographer Fadil Berisha. She and her family are a part of the Berisha tribe. Her grandfather, Ragip Berisha, was a witness and survivor of the Tivar Massacre.

== Miss Kosova 2018 ==
Berisha joined Miss Kosova 2018, where she was crowned as Miss Universe Kosovo 2018 pageant. She succeeded outgoing Miss Universe Kosovo 2016 Camila Barraza.

== Miss Universe 2018 ==
Berisha represented Kosovo at Miss Universe 2018 pageant in Bangkok, Thailand. But she was unplaced.

Awards and achievements
Preceded by Camila Barraza	Miss Universe Kosovo; 2018	Succeeded by Fatbardha Hoxha
