= Yllka Berisha =

Swedish-Albanian model and singer

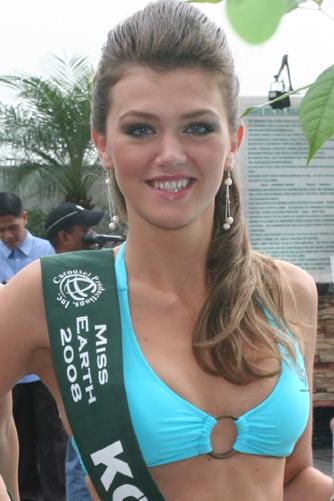
- Yllka Berisha at Miss Earth 2008
- Born: January 18, 1988 (age 38); Pristina, SAP Kosovo, Yugoslavia (modern Kosovo)
- Height: 1.76 m (5 ft 9 in)
- Beauty pageant titleholder
- Title: Miss Earth Kosovo 2008
- Hair color: Dark Blonde
- Eye color: Gray
- Major competitions: Miss Earth Kosovo 2008 (Winner); Miss Earth 2008 (Unplaced)

Yllka Berisha (born January 18, 1988) is a Kosovar–Swedish model, singer and beauty pageant titleholder who was crowned Miss Earth Kosovo 2008 and represented her country at Miss Earth 2008.

== Biography ==
Berisha was born January 18, 1988, in Pristina, at the time SAP Kosovo, SFR Yugoslavia. She moved permanently to Laholm in Sweden with her parents in 1992. She completed Swedish high-school on a science programme.

== Modelling and pageants ==
She won the title of Miss Kosovo on December 12, 2007. Berisha represented Kosovo at the Top Model of the World 2008 pageant in Egypt on January 18, 2008. She expressed hope of Kosovo becoming independent, so she could be the first woman to represent her country at the Miss Earth. Kosovo has since become an independent state. Before winning the Miss Kosovo title, Berisha was second runner up at the Miss Albania pageant and first runner up at the Miss Scandinavia pageant. At Miss Earth 2008 Berisha was unplaced on November 9, 2008.

== Personal life ==
Berisha speaks fluent Swedish, English and Albanian. She sees modelling as a hobby and aspires to become a medical doctor or an engineer. Berisha lives in Gothenburg, Sweden with her boyfriend. She and her family are a part of the Berisha tribe.

== Music career ==
Berisha is also a singer and has recorded two songs and one music video in Sweden. Her music producer is Genc Vela from 8-blockz. They wrote the lyrics for the first song together.
