= Nita Bahtiri =

- Born: Nita Bahtiri; February 26, 1993 (age 33); Pristina, AP Kosovo, FR Yugoslavia
- Genres: Pop, R&B
- Occupation: Singer
- Instrument: Piano
- Years active: 2011–present

Nita Bahtiri (born 26 February 1993) is a Kosovar singer and pianist. She rose to fame after taking part in the first season of The Voice of Albania. After the show, she took part in Top Fest twice, in 2012 and 2013.

== Biography ==
Bahtiri was born in Pristina, at the time Kosovo, Yugoslavia, to Kosovo Albanian parents. She finished the Prenkë Jakova musical high school and continued her piano studies at the Academy of Arts in the University of Pristina. At the age of 18, she signed up for The Voice of Albania. She performed "Angel" by Sarah McLachlan in the "Blind Auditions" together with her piano. She received a positive feedback from all the four judges, and chose Elton Deda as her mentor. She made it through the live shows, and finished fourth in her team.

After the show, she took part in the 9th edition of Top Fest with "Një shpirt" but failed to make it to the proceeding stages of the show. The following year, she returned with "Zemër e drynosur" and made it to the semi-finals.

== Discography ==
=== Singles ===
- 2012 – "Një shpirt" (One soul)
- 2013 – "Zemër e drynosur" (Locked heart)
