= Diana Avdiu =

Kosovar beauty pageant contestant

- Born: 11 June 1993 (age 33); Kosovska Mitrovica, Kosovo
- Height: 1.75 m (5 ft 9 in)
- Beauty pageant titleholder
- Title: Miss Universe Kosovo 2012; Miss Kosovo 2014
- Major competitions: Miss Universe Kosovo 2012; (Winner); Miss Universe 2012; (Top 16); (Miss Photogenic)

Diana Avdiu (born 11 June 1993 in Mitrovica, Kosovo) is a Kosovar model and beauty pageant titleholder who was crowned Miss Universe Kosovo 2012. She began her career as a model when she was 15 years old and has been featured on the covers of fashion magazine Teuta and in two years of runway presentations at New York Fashion Week.

== Pageantry ==
=== Miss Universe 2012 ===
Avdiu won the Miss Universe Kosovo competition on June 21, 2012, becoming the fifth representative of Kosovo^{[b]} at Miss Universe since its independence. This confirmed her place in the Miss Universe pageant held in December 2012 in Las Vegas. A pre-pageant favorite for the Miss Universe title, Avdiu won the Miss Photogenic Universe 2012 award for being the most photogenic contestant and became the fourth Miss Kosovo to enter the semifinals of the contest. In 2013, she crowned both Antigona Sejdiu and Mirjeta Shala as Kosovo's representatives to the Miss World and Miss Universe pageants, respectively, following a split in the domestic organization. She now resides in the United States where she works as model for Sherri Hill.

Awards and achievements
Preceded by Afërdita Dreshaj	Miss Universe Kosovo; 2012	Succeeded by Mirjeta Shala
