= Mirjeta Shala =

Kosovar model (born 1994)

- Born: 12 February 1994 (age 32); Vučitrn, FR Yugoslavia (present-day Vushtrri, Kosovo)
- Height: 1.80 m (5 ft 11 in)
- Beauty pageant titleholder
- Title: Miss Universe Kosovo 2013
- Major competitions: Miss Universe Kosovo 2013 (winner); Miss Universe 2013 (withdrew); Miss Universe 2015 (unplaced)

Mirjeta Shala (born 12 February 1994) is a Kosovar model and beauty pageant titleholder who was crowned Miss Kosovo 2013 and was to compete in Miss Universe 2013 before Kosovo withdrew from the pageant. In November 2013, she signed a contract with Trump Model Management.

== Personal life ==
Shala is a student of Economic and Marketing Business Administration at Universiteti AAB-Riinvest.

=== Miss Universe Kosovo 2013 ===
Shala was crowned Miss Kosova 2013 (Miss Universe Kosovo 2013) and was to represent Kosovo at Miss Universe 2013 in Moscow, Russia. She won the Miss Universe Kosovo competition on 17 August 2013 held in the capital, Pristina but did not compete. However, in October the Miss Universe Kosovo Organization withdrew from the Miss Universe pageant as since Russia does not recognize Kosovo as an independent nation, they do not accept Kosovar passports and Shala would not have been allowed into the country.

=== Appointment ===
On 18 October 2015 it was announced that the Miss Universe Kosovo pageant is cancelled for 2015 and that the next Miss Universe Kosovo pageant will be in 2016. Later, on the Miss Universe Kosovo Organization Facebook, it was announced that Shala was appointed to represent Kosovo at the Miss Universe 2015 pageant in the USA. She competed in the pageant on 20 December 2015 but did not place.

Awards and achievements
Preceded by Diana Avdiu	Miss Universe Kosovo; 2013	Succeeded by Artnesa Krasniqi
Awards and achievements
Preceded by Artnesa Krasniqi	Kosovo Representative at the Miss Universe; 2015	Succeeded by Camila Barraza
