= Zana Krasniqi =

Kosovar Albanian beauty pageant contestant

- Born: Zana Krasniqi; September 17, 1988 (age 38); Pristina, Kosovo
- Height: 1.71 m (5 ft 7 in)
- Beauty pageant titleholder
- Hair color: Brown
- Eye color: Green
- Major competitions: Miss Universe Kosovo 2008 (Winner); Miss Universe 2008 (Top 10)

Zana Krasniqi (born September 17, 1988 in Pristina) is an Albanian-Kosovar fashion model and beauty pageant titleholder who won Miss Universe Kosovo 2008. She represented Kosovo for the first time in Miss Universe and placed in the Top 10 of the Miss Universe 2008.

== Personal life ==
Zana Krasniqi is an Albanian-Kosovar who comes from a background of entertainers, including her father Naim Krasniqi who is an Albanian-Kosovar singer. On April 4, 2008, Fadil Berisha, the photographer of Miss Universe's official photos, hosted the inaugural "Miss Universe Kosova" pageant where Krasniqi was crowned and represented Kosovo in the Miss Universe pageant. Zana was trained by photographer Fadil Berisha. who worked with the Miss Universe organization, and is a fellow Kosovar Albanian. Her interests include singing, performing and modelling. Her career ambition is to be a fashion designer.

== See also ==
- Albanians in Kosovo
- Kosovo
- Miss Universe 2008

Preceded by -	Miss Universe Kosovo; 2008	Succeeded by Marigona Dragusha
