= Marigona Dragusha =

Kosovar Albanian beauty pageant titleholder

- Born: 23 September 1990 (age 36); Pristina, Kosovo
- Height: 1.75 m (5 ft 9 in)
- Beauty pageant titleholder
- Title: Miss Universe Kosovo 2009 (Winner)
- Hair color: Dark Brown/Black
- Eye color: Brown
- Major competition: Miss Universe 2009 (2nd runner-up)

Marigona Dragusha (born 23 September 1990), also known as Gona Dragusha, is an ethnic Albanian Kosovar model and beauty pageant titleholder who placed as the 2nd runner-up at the Miss Universe 2009 pageant. Dragusha won her national title, Miss Universe Kosovo, on 4 April 2009.

Besides her native Albanian language, Dragusha speaks English and Spanish.

Awards and achievements
Preceded by (Dominican Republic) Marianne Cruz	Miss Universe 2nd Runner-Up; 2009	Succeeded by (Australia) Jesinta Campbell
Preceded by Zana Krasniqi	Miss Universe Kosovo; 2009	Succeeded by Kështjella Pepshi
