= Miss Kosovo =

Beauty contest

- Miss Kosova
- Successor: Miss Universe Kosovo
- Established: 1970; 56 years ago
- Defunct: 2012; 14 years ago
- Type: Beauty pageant
- Headquarters: Pristina
- Location: Kosovo
- Official language: Albanian
- Affiliations: Miss Albania (1999–2007)
- Website: www.misskosova.net

Miss Kosovo (Miss Kosova) is a national Beauty pageant in Kosovo. Since 2008, Miss Kosova is responsible for selecting the country's representative to Miss Earth, which is an annual international beauty pageant promoting environmental awareness.

== History ==
=== 1994–2007: Early years ===
In the years 1998, 2004 and 2005, the contest was not held. Between 1994 and 2007, whilst Kosovo was a part of Yugoslavia or just Serbia, the contest was confined to Kosovo and recognized only by its organizers. Pre-2008 winners of the contest were able to represent Miss Albania owing to agreements with its sister organisation across the border.

Two winners had a successful pageant in Miss Albania: Venera Mustafa (1999 winner of both titles) and Agnesa Vuthaj (winning Miss Kosovo 2003 and Miss Albania 2004), who also participated internationally as Miss Albania.

=== 2008–2012: Miss Earth franchise ===
From 2008 after independence was declared, Miss Kosovo has been permitted to take part at the Miss Earth pageant. The Miss Kosovo pageant is organized by former titleholder Agnesa Vuthaj under her Agnesa Vuthaj Association. After Kosovo's declaration of independence, Miss Kosovo 2007 Yllka Berisha participated in the Miss Earth 2008 pageant but was unplaced. The Kosovar delegates from 2002 and 2003 for Miss Earth were from a different organization.

=== 2013–present: Miss Earth with Miss Universe ===
In 2013 Fadil Berisha and Agnesa Vuthaj took control of Miss Kosovo and retrieved the Miss Universe franchise. This happened after the previous Miss Universe Kosovo directors made the decision to send their winner to Miss World. Hence, there are two titleholders from this pageant - one for Miss Universe and one for Miss Earth.

== Titleholders ==
=== Miss Kosova ===
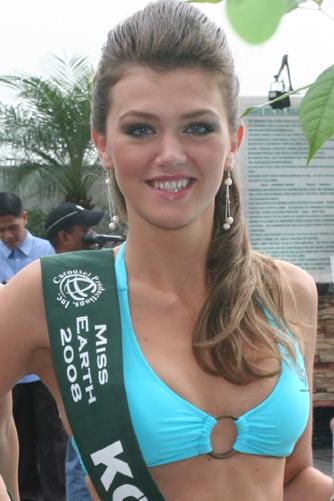
Yllka Berisha, Miss Kosova 2007 / Miss Earth 2008 delegate.

This list includes from the inception of Miss Kosova where the winners were usually sent to Miss Earth from 2008, until before the merging of the Miss Universe and Miss Earth franchises.

Year	Miss Kosova	Municipality
1970	Afërdita Zatriqi	—N/a
1990	Afërdita Paqarada	Pristina
1995	Blerta Syla	Istok
1996	Diellza Kolgeci	Pristina
1997	Adelina Ismaili	Pristina
1999	Venera Mustafa	Pristina
2000	Mimoza Harxhi	Peja
2001	Albina Hashani	Pristina
2002	Njomza Rozhaja	Peja
2003	Agnesa Vuthaj	Istok
2006	Besa Gashi	Drenas
2007	Yllka Berisha	Pristina
2008	Kaqusha Thaçi	—N/a
2009	Elza Marku	Gjakova
2010	Morena Taraku	Peja
2011	Nora Asani	Pristina
2012	Ajshe Babatinca	Pristina

== See also ==
- Miss Universe Kosovo
