= Fadil Berisha =

American photographer

Fadil Berisha is an Albanian-American fashion photographer living in New York City. He was once the official photographer for Miss Universe, Miss USA, and Rolex.
