= Miss Bolivia =

Beauty pageant

Miss Bolivia Organization
- Formation: 1930; 96 years ago
- Type: Beauty pageant
- Headquarters: Santa Cruz
- Location: Bolivia
- Members: Miss Universe; Miss World; Miss International; Miss Earth; Miss Supranational; Miss Grand International; Other pageants
- Official language: Spanish
- President: Gloria Suárez de Limpias
- Website: Official website

The Miss Bolivia is a national beauty pageant in Bolivia. The pageant was founded in 1930, and the first winner, Rosa Pizarro Araoz of Tarija, was sent to compete in Miss Latin America held in Miami, United States.

== History ==
The Miss Bolivia contest was organized for the first time in 1930 when the Miss Latin America pageant, headquartered in Miami, requested all participating countries to hold the national event to elect the country representatives. In the case of Bolivia, the newspaper El Diario took charge and coordinated with the prefectures and academies of fine arts of each department. So that, through commissions, each department could proceed with the election of their representative for the national contest, which was sponsored by the Miami National Bathing Beauty Pageant. The regional competitions happened in Potosí, Lapaz, Oruro, Tarija, Santa Cruz, and Cochabamba.

In the national final of Miss Bolivia 1930, held at the Rotary Club on February 15 in Lapaz, the representative of Tarija, Rosa Pizarro Araoz, was named the winner and was awarded by the first lady of Bolivia, Luisa Salinas Vega. Araoz then competed in the Miss Latin America in Miami, United States, where eight Latin countries participated, including Bolivia, Chile, Costa Rica, Panama, Panama Canal Zone, Peru, Ecuador, and Nicaragua, of whom the representative of Panama, Melinda Boyd, was elected the winner.

In 1959, the contest was managed by Gloria Suárez de Limpias who was the event's director until 1979.

== Official Divisions ==
Beni

- Miss Beni
- Srta. Beni
- Miss Moxitania

Chuquisaca

- Miss Chuquisaca
- Srta. Chuquisaca
- Miss La Plata

Cochabamba

- Miss Cochabamba
- Srta. Cochabamba
- Miss Valle

La Paz

- Miss La Paz
- Srta. La Paz
- Miss Illimani

Oruro

- Miss Oruro
- Srta. Oruro

Pando

- Miss Pando
- Srta. Pando

Potosí

- Miss Potosí
- Srta. Potosí

Santa Cruz

- Miss Santa Cruz
- Srta. Santa Cruz
- Miss Litoral
- Srta. Litoral

Tarija

- Miss Tarija
- Srta. Tarija
- Miss Andalucía

== Titleholders ==
Year	Miss Bolivia	Province	International competition	
Year	Miss Bolivia	Province	Pageant	Competition result
1930	Rosa Pizarro Araoz	Tarija	Miss Latin America 1930	Unplaced
1959	Corina Taborga	Tarija		
1968	Luz María Rojas	Santa Cruz		
1969	Roxana Brown Trigo	Santa Cruz		
1970	Ana Maria Landivar	Santa Cruz		
1971	Maria Alicia Vargas Vasquez	Santa Cruz		
1972	Roxana Sittic Harb	Santa Cruz		
1973	Teresa Isabel Callau	Santa Cruz		
1974	Jacqueline Gamarra Sckett	Santa Cruz		
1975	Carolina Elisa Aramayo Esteves	Santa Cruz		
1976	Liliana Gutiérrez Paz	Santa Cruz		
1977	Raquel Roca Kuikanaga	Santa Cruz		
1978	María Luisa Rendon	Cochabamba		
1979	Carmen Parada	Santa Cruz		
1980	Sonia Pereira	Santa Cruz		
1981	Maricruz Aponte	Santa Cruz		
1982	Sandra Villarroel Gallati	Santa Cruz		
1983	Cecilia Zamora	Tarija		
1984	Lourdes Elizabeth Aponte	La Paz		
1985	Gabriela Orozco	La Paz		
1986	Elizabeth O’Connor D’Arlach	Tarija		
1987	Patricia Arce	Santa Cruz		
1988	Ana Maria Pereira	Santa Cruz		
1989	Raquel Cors	Tarija		
1990	Rosario Rico Toro	Cochabamba		
1991	Selva Landívar	Santa Cruz		
1992	Natasha Gabriel Arana	Beni		
1993	Cecilia O'Connor-d'Arlach	Santa Cruz		
1994	Sandra Rivero Zimmermann	Santa Cruz		
1995	Natalia Cronenbold Aguilera	Santa Cruz		
1996	Helga Bauer Salas	Santa Cruz	Reina Hispanoamericana 1996	Winner; Dethroned
1997	Verónica Larrieu	Santa Cruz	Miss Universe 1998	Unplaced
1998	Susana Barrientos Roig	Santa Cruz	Reina Hispanoamericana 1998	Winner
1998	Susana Barrientos Roig	Santa Cruz	Miss Universe 1999	Unplaced
1999	Yenny Vaca Paz	Santa Cruz	Reina Hispanoamericana 1999	Winner
1999	Yenny Vaca Paz	Santa Cruz	Miss Universe 2000	Unplaced
2000	Claudia Andrea Arano	Santa Cruz	Miss Universe 2001	Unplaced
2001	Paola Coimbra Antipieff	Santa Cruz	Miss Universe 2002	Unplaced
2002	Irene Aguilera	Santa Cruz	Miss Universe 2003	Unplaced
2003	Gabriela Oviedo	Santa Cruz	Miss Universe 2004	Unplaced
2004	Andrea Abudinen Richter	Santa Cruz	Miss Universe 2005	Unplaced
2005	María Desiree Durán Morales	Santa Cruz	Miss Universe 2006	Top 10
2006	Jessica Anne Jordan Burton	Beni	Miss Universe 2007	Unplaced
2007	Katherine "Kate" David Céspedes	Santa Cruz	Miss Universe 2008	Unplaced
2008	Rosa Dominique Noemí Peltier De Liota	Cochabamba	Reina Hispanoamericana 2008	2nd runner-up
2008	Rosa Dominique Noemí Peltier De Liota	Cochabamba	Miss Universe 2009	Unplaced
2009	Claudia Arce Lemaitre	Chuquisaca	Miss Universe 2010	Unplaced
2010	María Olivia Pinheiro Menacho	Santa Cruz	Reina Hispanoamericana 2010	2nd runner-up
2010	María Olivia Pinheiro Menacho	Santa Cruz	Miss Universe 2011	Unplaced
2011	Yessica Mouton Gianella	Litoral	Reina Hispanoamericana 2011	1st runner-up
2011	Yessica Mouton Gianella	Litoral	Miss Universe 2012	Unplaced
2012	Alexia Laura Viruez Pictor	Santa Cruz	Reina Hispanoamericana 2012	1st runner-up
2012	Alexia Laura Viruez Pictor	Santa Cruz	Miss Universe 2013	Unplaced
2013	Claudia Maria Tavel Antelo	Santa Cruz	Reina Hispanoamericana 2013	6th runner-up
2013	Claudia Maria Tavel Antelo	Santa Cruz	Miss Universe 2014	Unplaced
2014	Romina Rocamonje Fuentes	Beni	Reina Hispanoamericana 2014	Winner
2014	Romina Rocamonje Fuentes	Beni	Miss Universe 2015	Unplaced
2015	Paula Caroline Schneider Aguilera (Resigned)	Santa Cruz	Reina Hispanoamericana 2015	Unplaced
2015	Paula Caroline Schneider Aguilera (Resigned)	Santa Cruz	Miss Universe 2016	Unplaced
2016	Antonella Moscatelli Saucedo	Santa Cruz	Miss Universe 2016	Unplaced
2017	Gleisy Noguer Hassen	Pando	Miss Universe 2017	Unplaced
2018	Marian Joyce Prado Rivera (Dethroned)	Santa Cruz	Reina Hispanoamericana 2018	3rd runner-up
2018	Marian Joyce Prado Rivera (Dethroned)	Santa Cruz	Miss Universe 2018	Unplaced
2019	Fabiana Hurtado Tarrazona	Santa Cruz	Miss Universe 2019	Unplaced
2020	Lenka Nemer Drpić	La Paz	Miss Universe 2022	Unplaced
2021	Nahemi Uequin Antelo	Santa Cruz	Miss Universe 2021	Unplaced
2022	Maria Fernanda Pavisic Rojas	Cochabamba	Dethroned	
2022	María Camila Sanabria Pereyra	Santa Cruz	Miss Grand International 2022	Unplaced
2022	María Camila Sanabria Pereyra	Santa Cruz	Miss Universe 2022	Unplaced
2023	María Estefany Rivero Giesse	Beni	Miss Universe 2023	Unplaced
2024	Juliana Barrientos Gaidrikh	Cochabamba	Miss Universe 2024	Top 12

== Titleholders under Promociones Gloria org. ==
=== Miss Bolivia Universo ===
- : Declared as Winner
- : Ended as runner-up or top 5/6 qualification
- : Ended as one of the finalists or semifinalists
- : Ended as special awards winner

The winner of Miss Bolivia Universo represents her country at the Miss Universe. On occasion, when the winner does not qualify (due to age) for either contest, a runner-up is sent.

Year	Department	Miss Bolivia	Placement at Miss Universe	Special Awards	Notes
2026	Oruro	Valeria Mena	TBA
2025	Beni	Yessica Hausermann Buhler	Unplaced
2024	Cochabamba	Juliana Barrientos Gaidrikh	Top 12	Voice For Change (Gold Winner)
2023	Beni	María Estefany Rivero Giesse	Unplaced
2022	Santa Cruz	María Camila Sanabria Pereyra	Unplaced
2022	Cochabamba	Maria Fernanda Pavisic Rojas	Dethroned
2021	Santa Cruz	Nahemi Uequin Antelo	Unplaced
2020	La Paz	Lenka Nemer Drpić	Unplaced	Social Impact award
2019	Santa Cruz	Fabiana Hurtado Tarrazona	Unplaced
2018	Santa Cruz	Marian Joyce Prado Ribera	Unplaced
2017	Pando	Gleisy Vera Noguer Hassen	Unplaced
2016	Santa Cruz	Fabiana Antonella Moscatelli Saucedo	Unplaced	Best National Costume (Top 12)
2015	Beni	Romina Rocamonje Fuentes	Unplaced
2014	Santa Cruz	Claudia María Tavel Antelo	Unplaced
2013	Santa Cruz	Alexia Laura Viruez Píctor	Unplaced
2012	Litoral	Yessica Sharit Mouton Gianella	Unplaced
2011	Santa Cruz	Maria Olivia Pinheiro Menacho	Unplaced	Best National Costume (7th Runner-up)
2010	Chuquisaca	Claudia Arce Lemaitre	Unplaced
2009	Cochabamba	Noemí Dominique Rosa Peltier De Liotta	Unplaced
2008	Santa Cruz	Katherine David Céspedes	Unplaced
2007	Beni	Jessica Anne Jordan Burtón	Unplaced
2006	Litoral	Maria Desirée Durán Morales	Top 10
2005	Santa Cruz	Paola Andrea Abudinen Richter	Unplaced
2004	Litoral	Gabriela Oviedo Serrate	Unplaced
2003	Santa Cruz	Irene Aguilera Vargas	Unplaced
2002	Santa Cruz	Paola Clarisse Coimbra Antipieff	Unplaced
2001	Litoral	Claudia Andrea Araño Antelo	Unplaced
2000	Litoral	Yenny Vaca Paz	Unplaced
1999	Santa Cruz	Susana Barrientos Roig	Unplaced
1998	Santa Cruz	Verónica María Larrieu Velasco	Unplaced
1997	Litoral	Helga Bauer Salas	Unplaced
1996	Santa Cruz	Natalia Cronenbold Aguilera	Unplaced
1995	Litoral	Sandra Rivero Zimmermann	Unplaced
1994	Tarija	Cecilia O'Connor-d'Arlach	Unplaced
1993	Beni	Roxana Arias Becerra	Unplaced		Designation — Designated as a representative to Miss Universe in 1993 by Miss Bolivia Promociones Gloria Organization.
1992	Tarija	Natasha Gabriela Arana Lema	Unplaced
1991	Santa Cruz	Maria Selva Landívar	Unplaced
1990	Cochabamba	Rosario Rico del Toro Pilar	Top 6
1989	Tarija	Raquel Cors Ulloa	Unplaced
1988	Santa Cruz	Ana Maria Pereira Parada	Unplaced
1987	Santa Cruz	Patricia Hortensia Arce Rocabado	Unplaced
1986	Tarija	Elizabeth O’Connor-d’Arlach	Unplaced
1985	La Paz	Gabriela Orozco Ruiz	Unplaced
1984	La Paz	Lourdes Elizabeth Aponte Hurtado	Unplaced
1983	Beni	Cecilia Zamora Oliva	Unplaced
1982	Santa Cruz	Sandra Irene Villarroel Gallati	Unplaced
1981	Santa Cruz	Vivian "Maricruz" Aponte Zambrana	Unplaced
1980	Santa Cruz	Carmen Sonia Pereira Parada	Unplaced
1979	Cochabamba	Maria Luisa Rendón	Unplaced
1978	Beni	Raquel Roca Kuikunaga	Unplaced
1977	Santa Cruz	Liliana Gutiérrez Paz	Unplaced
1976	La Paz	Carolina Elisa Aramayo Esteves	Unplaced
1975	Cochabamba	Jacqueline Gamarra Sckett	Unplaced
1974	Santa Cruz	Teresa Isabel Callau	Unplaced
1973	La Paz	Roxana Sittic Harb	Unplaced
1972	Santa Cruz	Mara Alicia Vargas Vásquez	Unplaced
1971	Chuquisaca	Ana María Landívar Gantier	Unplaced
1970	La Paz	Roxana Brown Trigo	Unplaced	Best National Costume
1969	Cochabamba	Luz Maria Rojas	Unplaced
1968	Santa Cruz	Roxana Bowles Chávez	Unplaced	Best Swimsuit
1967	Oruro	Marcela Montoya García	Unplaced	Best Swimsuit
1966	Santa Cruz	Maria Elena Borda	Unplaced
1965	Tarija	Patricia Estensoro Terazas	Unplaced
1964	La Paz	Olga Mónica del Carpio Oropeza	Top 15
1963	Santa Cruz	Ana Maria Velasco Gutiérrez	Unplaced
1962	Santa Cruz	Gabriela "Gaby" Roca Díaz	Unplaced
1961	Santa Cruz	Gloria Soruco Suárez	Unplaced
1960	Cochabamba	Nancy Aguirre	Unplaced
1959	La Paz	Corina Taborga	Unplaced

=== Miss Bolivia Mundo ===
- : Declared as Winner
- : Ended as runner-up or top 5/6 qualification
- : Ended as one of the finalists or semifinalists
- : Ended as special awards winner

Yearly, the first runner-up went to the Miss World competition. In recent years, Miss Bolivia formatted the new regulation from Miss World Organization to hold an independent pageant, Miss Bolivia Mundo. Later than that before the main event, the Miss Bolivia pageant, another section, Miss Bolivia Mundo will crown the winner to represent Bolivia at the Miss World competition.

Year	Department	Miss Bolivia Mundo	Placement at Miss World	Special Awards	Notes
2027	Cochabamba	Ash Castro	TBA
2026	Santa Cruz	Vanessa Kraljevic	Unplaced
2025	Santa Cruz	Olga Chávez	Unplaced
2024	No competition held
2023	Beni	Maria Fernanda Rivero Arteaga	Unplaced
2022	Miss World 2021 was rescheduled to 16 March 2022 due to the COVID-19 pandemic outbreak in Puerto Rico, no edition started in 2022
2021	Beni	Alondra Mercado Campos	Unplaced
2020	Due to the impact of COVID-19 pandemic, no competition held
2019	Santa Cruz	Iciar Díaz Camacho	Unplaced	Miss World Talent (Top 27)
2018	Cochabamba	Vanessa Vargas Gonzáles	Unplaced	Miss World Sport (1st Runner-up)
2017	Santa Cruz	Yasmin Pinto Solar	Unplaced
2016	Tarija	Leyda Lourdes Suárez Aldana	Unplaced
2015	Santa Cruz	Vivian Susana Serrano Llanos	Unplaced
2014	Litoral	Neidy Andrea Forfori Aguilera	Top 25	Beauty With a Purpose (Top 10)
2013	Tarija	María Alejandra Castillo	Unplaced
2012	La Paz	Mariana Garcia Mariaca	Unplaced	World Designer Dress Award
2011	Litoral	Yohana Paola Vaca Guzmán	Unplaced	Beach Beauty (Top 20); Top Model (Top 20)
2010	Beni	Maria Teresa Roca Córdova	Unplaced	Beach Beauty (Top 40)
2009	Santa Cruz	Flavia Fernanda Foianini Arzabe	Unplaced
2008	Beni	Jackelin Arias Kippes	Unplaced
2007	Cochabamba	Sandra Lea Hernández Saavedra	Unplaced
2006	Beni	Ana Maria Ortiz Rodal	Unplaced
2005	Litoral	Viviana Méndez Rivero	Unplaced
2004	Beni	María Nuvia Montenegro Apuri	Unplaced
2003	Beni	Helen Aponte Saucedo	Top 20	Miss Personality
2002	Beni	Alejandra Montero Chávez	Unplaced
2001	Santa Cruz	Claudia Etmüller Spinatto	Unplaced
2000	Cochabamba	Jimena Rico Toro Gamarra	Unplaced
1999	Tarija	Ana Raquel Rivera Zambrana	Unplaced
1998	Santa Cruz	Bianca Bauer Añez	Unplaced
1997	Santa Cruz	Mitzy Suárez Saucedo	Unplaced
1996	Tarija	Andrea Mariana Forti Sandoval	Unplaced
1995	Santa Cruz	Carla Patricia Morón Peña	Top 10
1994	Cochabamba	Mariel Gabriela Arce Taborga	Unplaced
1993	Santa Cruz	Claudia Lorena Arrieta Justiniano	Unplaced
1992	Tarija	Verónica Pino	Unplaced
1991	Cochabamba	Mónica Gamarra Giese	Unplaced
1990	Tarija	Daniela Domínguez	Unplaced
1989	Tarija	Victoria Julio	Unplaced
1988	Tarija	Claudia Nazer	Unplaced
1987	Cochabamba	Birgit Ellefsen	Unplaced
1986	Cochabamba	Claudia Arévalo Ayala	Unplaced
1985	Santa Cruz	Carolina Issa Abudinen	Unplaced
1984	Santa Cruz	Erika Weise	Unplaced
1983	Tarija	Ana Maria Taboada Arnold	Top 15
1982	Oruro	Brita Margareta Cederberg	Top 15
1981	Pando	Carolina Diaz Mansour	Unplaced
1980	Chuquisaca	Sonia Giovanna Malpartida	Unplaced
1979	Santa Cruz	Patricia Asbun Galarza	Unplaced
1978	Did not compete
1977	Santa Cruz	Elizabeth Ianonne Morón	Unplaced
1976	Did not compete
1975	Cochabamba	Maria Monica Guardia	Unplaced
Did not compete between 1966—1974
1965	Santa Cruz	Gabriella Cornel Kempff	Unplaced
1964	Did not compete
1963	La Paz	Rosario Lopera	Unplaced
1962	Did not compete
1961	Santa Cruz	Nancy Cortez Justiniano	Unplaced
1960	La Paz	Dalia Monasterios Thornee	Unplaced

=== Miss Bolivia Internacional ===
- : Declared as Winner
- : Ended as runner-up or top 5/6 qualification
- : Ended as one of the finalists or semifinalists
- : Ended as special awards winner

Between 1969 and 2014 the second runner-up of Miss Bolivia represented Bolivia at the Miss International pageant. Since 2015 after the committee divided pageant into two pageants, the Miss Bolivia Internacional selects by the first runner-up of Miss Bolivia pageant.

Year	Department	Miss Bolivia Internacional	Placement at Miss International	Special Awards	Notes
2026	La Paz	Kaori Fernández	TBA
2025	Cochabamba	Paola Guzmán Sanchez	2nd Runner-Up
2024	Santa Cruz	Camila Ribera Roca	1st Runner-Up
2023	Santa Cruz	Vanessa Hayes Schutt	4th Runner-Up
2022	Pando	Carolina Fernández Menacho	Unplaced
Due to the impact of COVID-19 pandemic, no competition held between 2020—2021
2019	Chuquisaca	Valentina Pérez Medina	Unplaced
2018	Beni	Maria Elena Antelo Molina	Unplaced
2017	Litoral	Carla Patricia Maldonado Simoni	Unplaced	Miss International America
2016	Tarija	Katherine "Katty" Aysathu Añazgo Orozco	Unplaced
2015	Cochabamba	Alejandra Panonzo Muguertegui	Unplaced
2014	Santa Cruz	Mory Joselyn Toro Leigue	Unplaced
2013	Chuquisaca	Adriana Delgadillo Galvan	Unplaced
2012	Pando	Stephanie Nuñez Nogales	Unplaced
2011	Santa Cruz	Daniela Michelle Núñez del Prado Serrano	Unplaced
2010	Santa Cruz	Ximena Vargas Parada	Unplaced
2009	Tarija	Laura Denisse Olivera Rivarola	Unplaced
2008	Cochabamba	Paula Andrea Peñarrieta Chaga	Unplaced
2007	Santa Cruz	Angélica Olavarría Vacao	Unplaced
2006	Santa Cruz	Pamela Justiniano Saucedo	Unplaced
2005	Santa Cruz	Gretel María Stehli Parada	Unplaced
2004	Tarija	Vanessa Patricia Morón Jarzun	Unplaced
2003	Santa Cruz	Carmen Muriel Cruz Claros	Top 12
2002	Litoral	Edith Carla Ameller Zubelsa	Unplaced
2001	La Paz	Joan Priscilla Quiroga Sarmiento	Unplaced
2000	Santa Cruz	Katherine Villarroel	Unplaced
1999	Santa Cruz	Natalia Arteaga Gamarra	Unplaced
1998	Litoral	Liliana Peña Guachalla	Top 15
1997	Tarija	Fabiana Nieva Caso	Unplaced
1996	Santa Cruz	Elka Grothenhorst Pacheco	Top 15
1995	Tarija	Liliana Arce Angulo	Top 15
1994	Santa Cruz	Maria Renée David	Unplaced
1993	Santa Cruz	Maria Cristina Tondelli	Unplaced
1992	Santa Cruz	Ana Paola Roca Mercado	Unplaced
1991	Cochabamba	Rosmy Tamara Pol	Unplaced
1990	Santa Cruz	Giselle Greminger	Top 10	Best National Costume
1989	Santa Cruz	Katerine Rivera Vaca	Unplaced
1988	Santa Cruz	Sonia Montero	Unplaced
1987	Litoral	Gouldin Balcázar	Unplaced
1986	Beni	Gloria Patricia Roca	Unplaced
1985	Tarija	Ana Patricia Castellanos	Unplaced
1984	Santa Cruz	Maria Cristina Gómez	Unplaced
1983	Santa Cruz	Eliana Limpias Suárez	Unplaced	Miss Friendship
1982	Santa Cruz	Beatrice Peña	Unplaced
1981	Santa Cruz	Rosario Suárez	Did not compete
1980	Santa Cruz	Maria Beatriz Landívar Olmos	Unplaced
1979	Santa Cruz	Sonia Beatriz Villarroel	Unplaced
1978	—	Rosita de Lourdes Requeña	Unplaced	Miss Friendship
1977	—	Miriam Coimbra	Unplaced
1976	—	Martha Rosa Baeza	Unplaced
1975	—	Rosario Maria del Blanco	Unplaced
1974	—	Dilian Nela Martínez	Unplaced
1973	—	Rosa Maria Columba González	Unplaced
1972	—	Leticia Brunn Aguilera	Unplaced
1971	—	Maria Villarejo	Unplaced
1970	—	Nelly Zenteno Pereira	Unplaced
1969	—	Erika Kohlenberger	Unplaced
1968	—	Ana Maria Urenda Amelunga	Unplaced	Miss Friendship
1967	—	Maria Cristina Ibáñez Brown	Unplaced
Did not compete between 1963—1966
1962	—	Olga Pantoja Antelo	Unplaced
1961	—	Carmen Anze	Unplaced
1960	—	Edmy Arana Ayala	Unplaced

=== Miss Grand Bolivia ===
- : Declared as Winner
- : Ended as runner-up or top 5/6 qualification
- : Ended as one of the finalists or semifinalists
- : Ended as special awards winner

Promociones Gloria held the Miss Grand International license for Bolivia from 2013 to 2025. During this period, the country's representatives were primarily selected through the Miss Bolivia pageant, although direct appointments were made in some years. Following the end of the partnership between Promociones Gloria and Miss Grand International in 2025, the Miss Grand Bolivia license was transferred to Alex de la Rea in 2026.

Year	Miss Grand Bolivia	Original national title	Placement	Note
2013	Mariana García	Miss Bolivia World 2012	Unplaced
2014	Camila Lepere	Miss Bolivia Grand 2014	Unplaced	Obtained the title from the Miss Bolivia 2014 pageant.
2015	Adriana Delgadillo	Miss Bolivia International 2013	Unplaced	Obtained the title from the Miss Bolivia 2013 pageant.
2016	Estefania Senzano	Miss Bolivia Grand 2016	Unable to compete	Obtained the title from the Miss Bolivia 2016 pageant.
2016	Joselyn Toro	Miss Bolivia International 2014	Unplaced	Obtained the title from the Miss Bolivia 2014 pageant.
2017	Mariem Suárez	3rd runner-up Miss Bolivia 2017	Unplaced
2018	Elena Romero	Miss Bolivia Grand 2018	Unplaced	Obtained the title from the Miss Bolivia 2018 pageant.
2019	Natalia Paz Rojas	Miss Bolivia Grand 2019	Unplaced	Obtained the title from the Miss Bolivia 2019 pageant.
2020	María José Terrazas	2nd runner-up Miss Bolivia 2020	Unable to compete
2020	Teresita Sanchez	6th runner-up Miss Bolivia 2020	Unplaced
2021	Eloísa Gutiérrez	Miss Bolivia Earth 2014	Unplaced	Obtained the title from the Miss Bolivia 2021 pageant.
2022	Alondra Mercado	Miss Bolivia World 2020	Unable to compete
2022	Camila Sanabria	Miss Bolivia Supranational 2022	Unplaced	Obtained the title from the Miss Bolivia 2022 pageant.
2023	Victoria Olguín	Miss Bolivia Grand 2023	Unplaced	Obtained the title from the Miss Bolivia 2023 pageant.
2024	Carolina Granier	Appointed	Unplaced
2025	Alexandra Rocha	Appointed	Unplaced

Miss Grand Bolivia's gallery

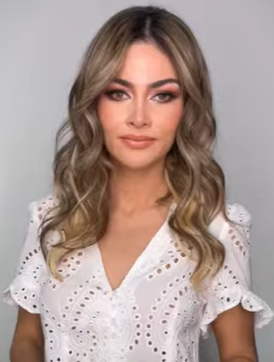
Camila Sanabria (2022)

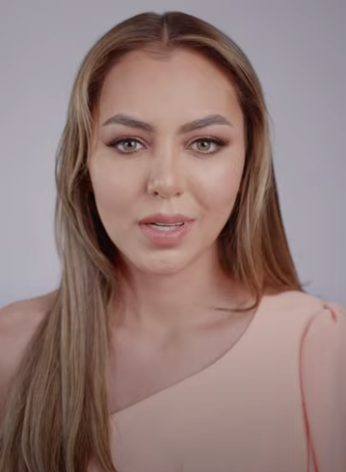
Victoria Olguín (2023)

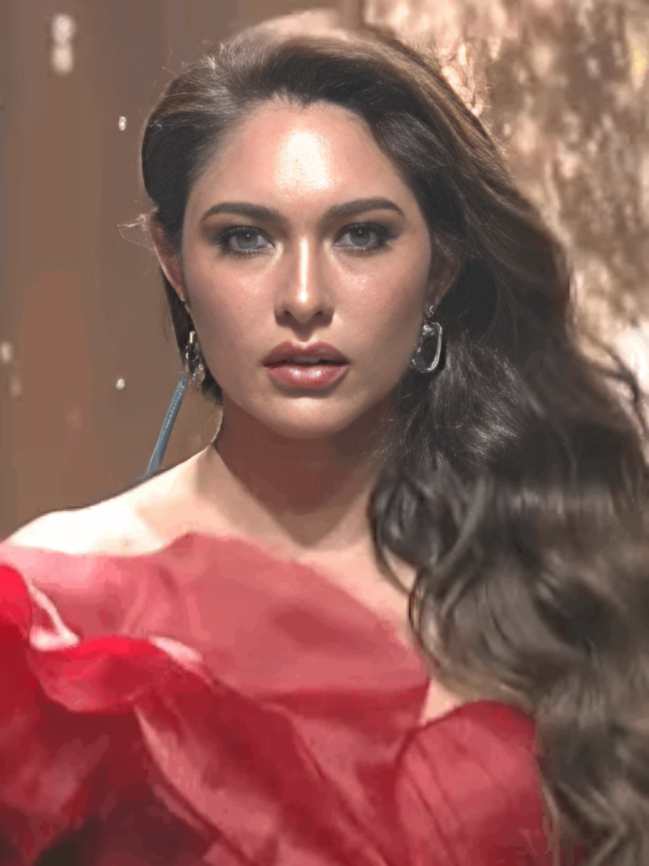
Carolina Granier (2024)

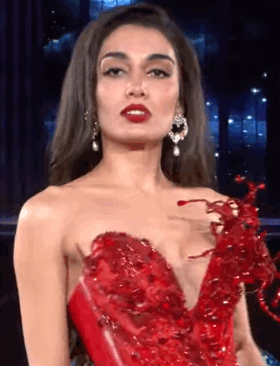
Alexandra Rocha (2025)

Kaithlyn Da Rocha (2026)

=== Miss Bolivia Tierra ===
- : Declared as Winner
- : Ended as runner-up or top 5/6 qualification
- : Ended as one of the finalists or semifinalists
- : Ended as special awards winner

Between 2001 and 2014 the third runner-up of Miss Bolivia represented Bolivia at the Miss Earth pageant. Began in 2015 the second runner-up of Miss Bolivia will go to Miss Earth pageant.

Year	Department	Miss Bolivia Tierra	Placement at Miss Earth	Special Awards	Notes
2024	La Paz	Steffany Arriaza	Unplaced
2023	Santa Cruz	Ivana Girard	Unplaced
2022	Litoral	Fabiane Valdivia	Unplaced
2021	Cochabamba	Sarah Teran	Unplaced
2020	Chuquisaca	Valentina Perez	Unplaced
2019	Oruro	Fernanda Vaca Pereira	Unplaced	(gold) Miss Friendship (FIRE Group)
2018	Tarija	Yenifer Karen Quispe Nava	Unplaced
2017	Santa Cruz	Giancarla Fernández Ferrufino	Unplaced	(gold) Best National Costume (South América)
2016	Cochabamba	Eliana Pamela Villegas Timm	Unplaced	Miss Gubat; (silver) Best National Costume (The Americas); (bronze) Best Long Gown (Group 1)
2015	La Paz	Vinka Nemer Drpic	Unplaced		Jazmín Duran Valda did not compete for personal reasons; another contestant took over as the new Miss Bolivia Tierra 2015.
2014	Chuquisaca	Eloisa Gutiérrez	Unplaced	(silver) Best Swimsuit (Group 1); (silver) Resort Wear (Group 1); Eco-Beauty (Top 10)
2013	Cochabamba	María René Carmona Soliz	Unplaced	Miss Ever Bilena (Sponsor); (bronze) Best National Costume (America); Best Swimsuit (Top 15); Resort Wear (Top 15)
2012	Beni	Dayana Dorado Moreno	Unplaced
2011	La Paz	Valeria Odilia Avedaño Avila	Unplaced
2010	Santa Cruz	Yovana O’Brien Méndez	Unplaced
2008	La Paz	Dania Carolina Urquiola Rodríguez	Unplaced		Paula Andrea Peñarrieta Chaga resigned as Miss Bolivia Tierra, another contestant took over the title as Miss Bolivia Tierra 2008.
2007	Tarija	Carla Loreto Fuentes Rivero	Unplaced
2006	Beni	Jéssica Anne Jordan Burton	Unplaced
2005	Tarija	Vanessa Patricia Morón Jarzun	Unplaced
2004	Santa Cruz	Carmen Muriel Cruz Claros	Unplaced
2003	Tarija	Claudia Cecilia Azaeda Melgar	Unplaced	Miss Photogenic
2002	Litoral	Susana Valeria Vaca Díez	Unplaced
2001	Santa Cruz	Catherine Villarroel Márquez	Top 10

=== Miss Bolivia Supranacional ===
- : Declared as Winner
- : Ended as runner-up or top 5/6 qualification
- : Ended as one of the finalists or semifinalists
- : Ended as special awards winner

Year	Department	Miss Bolivia Supranacional	Placement at Miss Supranational	Special Awards	Notes
2026	Santa Cruz	Eugenia Redin	TBA	TBA
2025	Santa Cruz	Vanessa Hayes	Top 12
2024	La Paz	Estefanía Ibarra	Top 25	Supra Model of Americas
2023	Cochabamba	Stephanie Terrazas	Unplaced
2022	Potosi	Macarena Castillo	Top 24
2021	Cochabamba	Luz Claros Gallardo	Unplaced
Due to the impact of COVID-19 pandemic, no competition in 2020
2019	Beni	María Elena Antelo Molina	Unplaced
2018	La Paz	Ilseen Olmos Ferrufino	Unplaced
2017	Beni	Romina Rocamonje Fuentes	Top 25
2016	Santa Cruz	Yesenia Barrientos Castro	Unplaced
2015	Santa Cruz	Sharon Valverde Zeballos	Unplaced
2014	Beni	María Fernanda Rojas Pedraza	Unplaced
2013	Beni	Wilma Teresa Talamás Melgar	Unplaced
2012	Tarija	Adriana Rivera Benítez	Unplaced
2011	Cochabamba	Beatriz Olmos Balcázar	Unplaced
2010	Beni	Daniela Tórrez Soliz	Unplaced

== See also ==
- Mister Bolivia
