= Angenie Simon =

Curaçaoan beauty queen (1985)

- Born: Angenie Anamaria Simon; July 26, 1985 (age 41); Willemstad, Curaçao
- Height: 1.78 m (5 ft 10 in)
- Beauty pageant titleholder
- Hair color: Dark Brown
- Eye color: Dark Brown
- Major competitions: Miss Universe 2009; Miss World 2010; Miss Caraïbes Hibiscus 2008 (Winner); Miss Universe Curaçao 2008 (First runner-up); Miss Universe Curaçao 2009 (Winner); Miss World Curaçao 2010 (Winner); Reina Hispanoamericana 2012

Angenie Anamaria Simon (born July 26, 1985) is a Curaçaoan model and beauty pageant titleholder who won the Miss Curaçao 2009 and went to the Miss Universe 2009 in The Bahamas, and the Miss World 2010 in Sanya, People's Republic of China. She earned a place in the national and regional pageant history records by being the first Miss Caraïbes Hibiscus winner who was crowned by a compatriot. Currently she is working as a Financial Assistant and she took in 2011 the challenge in partnering with national social entrepreneur and international youth ambassador Gwendell Mercelina Jr. for the Miss Caraïbes Hibiscus Curaçao pageant.

== Miss Caraïbes Hibiscus ==
In 2008, Angenie participated in the Miss Curaçao 2009 Pageant and placed as 1st runner-up after winning several titles: Miss Personality, Most Beautiful Legs, Most Dynamic, Miss Photogenic, and Miss Elegance. As 1st runner-up, she earned the right to the Miss Caraïbes Hibiscus 2008 pageant, a title which at that time was held by Curaçao's Laurien Angelista. Laurien went on to crown Angenie as the new Miss Caraïbes Hibiscus, the first time in the Miss Caraïbes Hibiscus Pageant history that a country crowns another country.

== Miss Universe ==
Ashanta Macauly, Miss Curaçao 2009, resigned her title 7 weeks before the Miss Universe 2009 pageant, due to physical and health problems. As 1st runner-up, Angenie assumed the title and went on represent Curaçao in the Miss Universe Pageant.

The 58th Miss Universe pageant, was held at the Imperial Ballroom, Atlantis Paradise Island, in Nassau, Bahamas on August 23, 2009. It was the first back to back victories in Miss Universe history: Stefania Fernandez of Venezuela, was crowned Miss Universe 2009 by outgoing titleholder Dayana Mendoza. 84 countries and territories competed for the title and the pageant was broadcast live on NBC and Telemundo.

== Miss World ==
As the 2010 edition of Señorita Kòrsou or Miss Curaçao World 2010 was rescheduled for a later date, the REPROD organization selected Angenie as Miss World Curaçao 2010.

The 60th Miss World pageant was held on October 30, 2010, in Sanya, People's Republic of China; after Vietnam backed out of the hosting contract. Kaiane Aldorino of Gibraltar crowned her successor Alexandria Mills of the United States as Miss World 2010.

== Reina Hispanoamericana ==
This annual beauty pageant began in 1991 as Reina Sudamericana (English: South American Queen), is based in Santa Cruz de la Sierra, Bolivia. Up to 2003 the participants were restricted to the 10 countries in South America; in 2004 participants from Panama and Costa Rica in Central America were invited; and in 2006 participants from Dominican Republic, Nicaragua, Puerto Rico, and Spain joined. In 2007 Mexico, Guatemala, Honduras, and United States were added, and the name changed to Reina Hispanoamericana. The pageant is organized by Promociones Gloria, based in Bolivia. More than 15 contestants participate every year.

In 2011, for the first time in history a Miss Curaçao, in the hands of the representative Evalina van Putten gets crowned by Caroline Medina of Venezuela as Reina Hispanoamericana 2011

In deliberation with the international organization seeking for the best delegate to represent Curaçao in the 2012' event, Angenie Simon was chosen only days before the Latin American pageant. This time she failed to bring the crown home, in this case Sarodj Bertin from Haiti, received the title from the hands of Evalina van Putten of Curaçao, Reina Hispanoamericana 2011.

Awards and achievements
Preceded by Laurien Angelista (Curaçao)	Miss Caraïbes Hibiscus; 2008	Succeeded by Yoly Hawley (Sint Maarten)
