= Señorita Curaçao =

Beauty pageant

- Formation: 1975
- Type: Beauty pageant
- Headquarters: Willemstad
- Location: Curaçao
- Members: Miss World; Miss Earth; Miss Supranational
- Official language: Dutch
- Organization: Dushi Magazine
- Website: Official website

Señorita Curaçao (In Papiamento: Señorita Kòrsou) is a national beauty pageant in Curaçao. This pageant is unrelated to the Miss Curaçao or Miss International Curaçao pageant.

== History ==
Early for Curaçao at International pageant from Miss Curaçao. The pageant started in 1963 and since then it had sent contestants to the Miss World pageants. The organization started with the creation of the Curaçao Youth Beauty Contest Organization (CYBECO).

Since 2007, a national winner is selected for this international pageant, current titleholder is Stephanie Rose-Chang and competed at Miss World.

== Titleholders ==
Color key

- Declared as Winner
- Ended as runner-up
- Ended as one of the finalists or semifinalists

=== Representatives at Miss World ===
Curaçao was debuted at the Miss World occurred in 1975. The 1st Runner-up or hand-picked delegate is sent as the national representative. Of all representatives from the island, 1 of them placed in the semifinals in 2002 and two won special awards in 2000 and 2008. Since 2007, a national winner is selected for this international pageant, current titleholder is Stephanie Rose-Chang.

Year	Miss World Curaçao	Placement	Special Awards
1975	Elvira Bakker	Unplaced	
1976	Viveca Marchena	Unplaced	
1977	Xiomara Winklaar	Unplaced	
1978	Silvana Trinidad	Unplaced	
1980	Soraida de Windt	Unplaced	
1981	Mylene Gerard	Unplaced	
1982	Vendetta Roozendal	Unplaced	
1983	Yvette Domacasse	Unplaced	
1984	Ivette Atacho	Unplaced	
1985	Lidushka Curiel	Unplaced	
1987	Diana Fraai	Unplaced	
1988	Anushka Cova	Unplaced	
1989	Supharmy Sadjie	Unplaced	
1990	Jacqueline Nelleke Josien Krijger	Unplaced	
1991	Nashaira Desbarida	Unplaced	
1992	Christina Bakhuis	Unplaced	
1993	Sally Daflaar	Unplaced	
1994	Marisa Bos	Unplaced	
1995	Danique Regales	Unplaced	
1996	Yandra Faulborn	Unplaced	
1998	Jearmeane Colastica	Unplaced	
2000	Jozaine Marianella Wall	Unplaced	Queen of Caribbean
2002	Ayanette Mary-Ann Ileana Statia	Top 20	
2003	Angeline Fernandine Da Silva Goes	Unplaced	
2004	Sue-Ann Stephanie Hudson	Unplaced	
2006	Fyrena Judica Hannah Martha	Unplaced	
2007	Mckeyla Antoinette Richards	Unplaced	
2008	Norayla María Francisco	Unplaced	Miss World Top Model (Top 10)
2009	Chantalle Thomassen	Unplaced	
2010	Angenie Anamaria Simon	Unplaced	
2011	Monifa Jansen	Unplaced	
2012	Stephanie Rose-Chang	Unplaced	Miss World Talent (Top 14)
2013	Xafira Urselita	Unplaced	Miss World Talent (Top 16), Miss World Beach Beauty (Top 25)
2014	Gayle Sulvaran	Unplaced	
2015	Alexandra Krijger	Unplaced	Miss World Sport (Top 24), Miss World Talent (Top 14)
2016	Sabrina Namias de Castro	Unplaced	
2016	Nashaira Balentien	Did not compete	
2017	Vanity Girigori	Unplaced	
2018	Nazira Colastica	Unplaced	
2019	Sharon Meyer	Unplaced	
2020	Due to the impact of COVID-19 pandemic, no pageant in 2020		
2021	Alvinette Soliana	Unplaced	
2022	Due to the impact of COVID-19 pandemic, no pageant in 2022		
2023	Nashaira Balentien	Unplaced	
2024	No competition held		
2025	Shubrainy Dams	Unplaced	
2026	Lishantely Jennie	Unplaced	
2027	TBA	TBA	

=== Representatives at Miss Earth ===
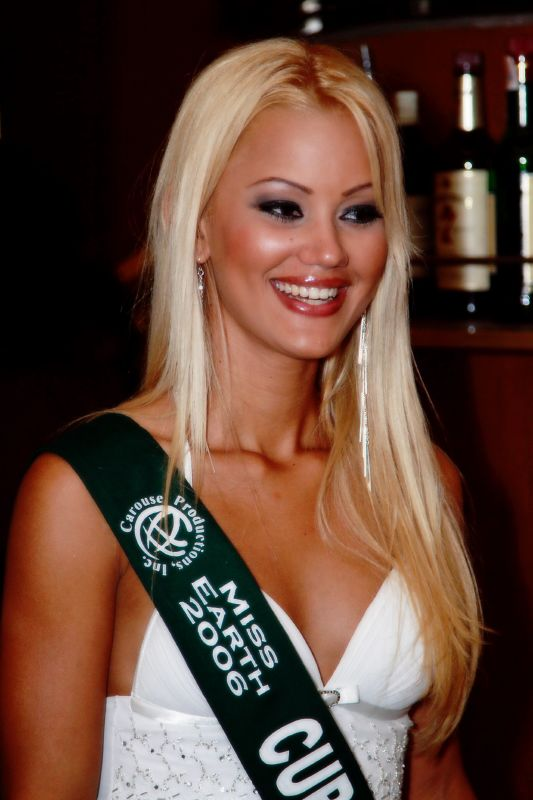
Miss Earth Curaçao 2006 Krystal Sprock during the Miss Earth 2006 pageant

The second title of Señorita Curaçao will compete at Miss Earth. Curaçao made a debut in 2006. The runner-up or some delegates will pick by Miss Curaçao to compete at the Miss Earth, an annual international beauty pageant promoting environmental awareness.

Year	Miss Earth Curaçao	Placement	Special Awards
2006	Kristal Rose Sprock	Unplaced	
2007	Fyrena Judica Hannah Martha	Did not compete	
2009	Amada Beatrix Hernandez	Did not compete	
2010	Norayla María Francisco	Unplaced	
2011	Miluska Willems	Unplaced	
2013	Archangela Garcia	Unplaced	
2014	Akisha Albert	Unplaced	
2018	Alexandra Atalita	Unplaced	
Did Not compete between 2019 and 2023

=== Representatives at Miss Supranational ===
The third title of Señorita Curaçao will compete at Miss Supranational. Curaçao made a debut at Miss Supranational 2011. The runner-up or some delegates will pick by Miss Curaçao to compete at the Miss Supranational.

Year	Miss Supranational Curaçao	Placement	Special Awards
2011	Melissa van de Laar	Unplaced	
Did not compete between 2012 and 2014
2015	Chesley Verbond	Unplaced	
Did not compete between 2016 and 2021
2022	Risandra Simon	Unplaced	
2023	Andreina Pereira	Top 24	Contestants' Choice; Miss Supranational Caribbean
2024	Chanelle de Lau	4th Runner-up	Supra Chat Winner
2025	Quishantely Leito	2nd Runner-up	
2026	Veronica Pichardo	Unplaced	

== Additional Details on Curaçao's representatives ==
- 2000 Jozaine Marianella Wall

Jozaine Marianella Wall is one of the two Miss Curaçao that did not attend the Miss Universe pageant. She was 17 years old at the time she won the national pageant which unabled her to compete at this pageant whose minimum age is 18. After a legal battle with the organizers, Jozaine was sent to the Miss World 2000 pageant in London, United Kingdom. She did not place in the Top Ten, but she managed to win the Queen of the Caribbean title.

- 2002 Ayanette Mary-Ann Ileana Statia

Ayanette Mary-Ann Ileana Statia competed at Miss Universe 2002 celebrated in San Juan, Puerto Rico. Since her election Ayanette became a strong favorite considered as the best black contestant of the pageant, but Curaçao's name was not called in the semifinals of Miss Universe 2002. After Miss Universe, Ayanette was sent to Miss World 2002 held in Nigeria where she became Curaçao's first and only semifinalist so far in Miss World.

- 2003-2004 Angeline Fernandine Da Silva Goes

Angeline Fernandine Da Silva Goes was the first runner-up of the 2003 Miss Curaçao pageant won by Vanessa Maria Van Arendonk. With her placement she had the duty to represent Curaçao at the Miss World 2003 pageant held in Sanya, People's Republic of China. After her performance in Miss World, a group of fans and friends from around the world made a formal petition to Sheida Wever, president of the national pageant, to send her to the Miss Universe pageant. Angeline was chosen as Curaçao's representative to the Miss Universe 2004 pageant held in Quito, Ecuador. Angeline went to the two most important international beauty pageants in the world without even winning the national pageant.

- 2008 Norayla Francisco

Norayla Maria Francisco received the title of Miss World Curaçao on 2008 earning the right to represent the island in Miss World 2008 in Johannesburg, South Africa. In the Miss World Top Model competition held in Soweto, Norayla placed in the Top 10 out of 109 contestants.
