= Miss Universo Italia 2009 =

- Date: May 27, 2009
- Venue: Palariccione, Riccione, Italy
- Winner: Laura Valenti

The Miss Universo Italia 2009 pageant was held on May 27, 2009. The winner was Laura Valenti, who went on to represent Italy at Miss Universe 2009, which took place in the Bahamas on August 23, 2009. Valenti did not place in the semis.

== Results ==
- Miss Universo Italia 2009 : Laura Valenti
- 1st Runner Up : Mirella Sessa
- 2nd Runner Up : Anna Gigli Molinari
- 3rd Runner Up : Luna Isabella Voce
- 4th Runner Up : Fiorella Isoni
- 5th Runner Up : Antonella Eyan
