= Reina Hispanoamericana 2017 =

27th Reina Hispanoamericana pageant

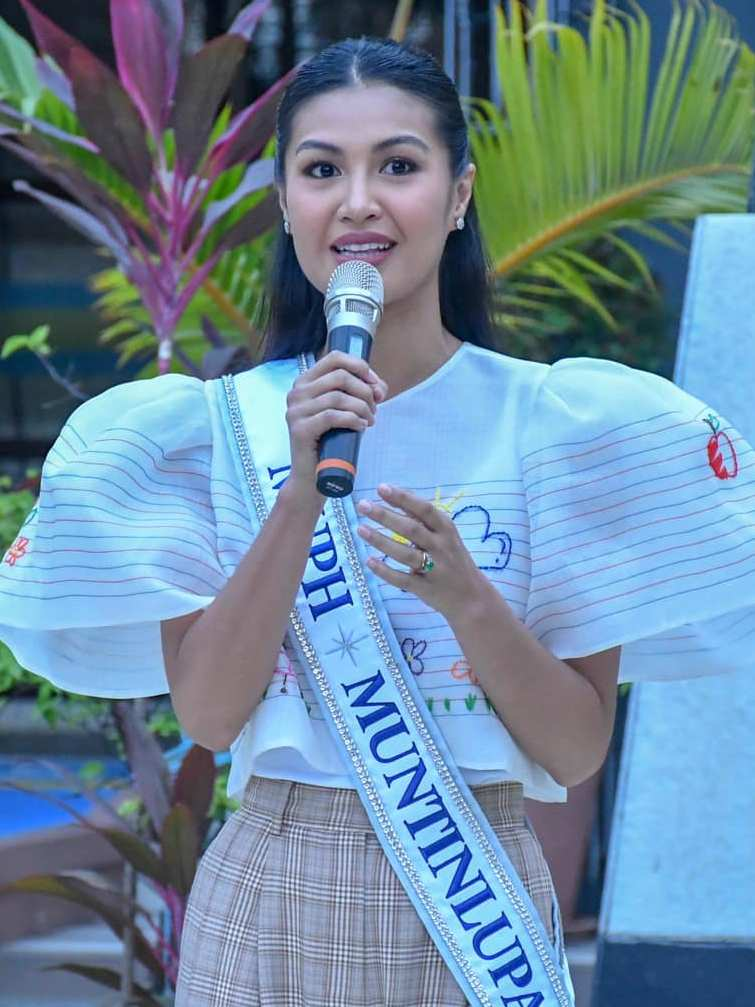
- Winwyn Marquez
- Date: 4 November 2017
- Venue: Salón Sirionó, Fexpocruz, Santa Cruz de la Sierra, Bolivia
- Broadcaster: Red Uno, GMA News TV (delayed telecast)
- Entrants: 27
- Placements: 10
- Debuts: Australia; Canada; Philippines; Portugal
- Withdrawals: Europe; Haiti
- Returns: Costa Rica; Cuba; El Salvador
- Winner: Teresita Ssen Marquez; Philippines

Reina Hispanoamericana 2017 was the 27th Reina Hispanoamericana pageant, held at the Salón Sirionó, Fexpocruz in Santa Cruz de la Sierra, Bolivia, on November 4, 2017.

Maria Camilla Soleibe of Colombia crowned Teresita Ssen Marquez of the Philippines as her successor at the end of the event. It was also the Philippines' first ever victory at the contest, and achieved their best result — winning on their debut year.

== Results ==
=== Placements ===
Placement	Contestant
Reina Hispanoamericana 2017	Philippines – Teresita Ssen Marquez
Virreina Hispanoamericana 2017	Curaçao – Akisha Albert
1st Runner-Up	Brazil – Laís Berté
2nd Runner-Up	Venezuela – Victoria D'Ambrosio
3rd Runner-Up	Mexico – Karla López
4th Runner-Up	Bolivia – Katherine Añazgo
5th Runner-Up	Cuba – Gladys Carredeguas
6th Runner-Up	Paraguay – Daisy Lezcano
7th Runner-Up	Chile – Valentina Schnitzer
8th Runner-Up	Peru – Lorena Larriviere

=== Order of Announcements ===
Top 10

1. Philippines
2. Curacao
3. Brazil
4. Chile
5. Cuba
6. Venezuela
7. Mexico
8. Peru
9. Bolivia
10. Paraguay

== Winning answer ==
Final question: "How will you promote the Hispanic-American culture with the great difficulty or barrier of language?"

Winning answer:

Language can be learned but the will and determination to contribute to the organization cannot. It has to come from the heart. It has to be natural. I believe that kindness is a universal language that if you treat people with tolerance, patience and love, you will understand each other. The Hispanic culture is not about language only. It’s about love for God, love for country, love for history and culture and love for family. As a Filipina with a unique heritage, I have instilled that. I am ready to promote the Hispanic culture not just in Asia but in the whole world. It is time to celebrate the Hispanic culture. It is meant to be celebrated.

== Contestants ==
27 contestants competed for the title.

Country / Territory	Contestant
Argentina	Denice Gómez Véliz
Australia	Sara Salmeron
Bolivia	Katherine Añazgo Orozco
Brazil	Lais Berté
Canada	Camila Gonzalez
Chile	Valentina Schnitzer
Colombia	Zeger Iguarán Issa
Costa Rica	Monica Zamora
Cuba	Gladys Carredeguas
Curacao	Akisha Albert
Dominican Republic	Lytza Alvarez Crestana
Ecuador	Nicole Hidalgo Silva
El Salvador	Gabriela Orellana
Guatemala	Yusela Sifontes
Honduras	Sinea David
Mexico	Karla López Berumen
Nicaragua	Ariadna Orellana
Panama	Carolina Castillo
Paraguay	Daisy Lezcano
Peru	Lorena Larriviere
Philippines	Teresita Ssen Marquez
Portugal	Tânia Rodrigues Costa
Puerto Rico	Kristina Vélez Toledo
Spain	Jessica González
United States	Francis Bautista
Uruguay	Magdalena Cohendet
Venezuela	María Victoria D'Ambrosio

== Crossovers ==
Miss Universe

- 2016: Uruguay - Magdalena Sarraciano
- 2018: Curacao - Akisha Albert (Top 10)

Miss International

- 2016: Bolivia - Katherine Añazgo Orozco
- 2018: Canada - Camila Gonzalez
- 2018: Paraguay - Daisy Lezcano (Top 15)

Miss Earth

- 2014: Curacao - Akisha Albert

Miss Supranational

- 2011: Portugal - Tania Rodrigues Costa
- 2015: Chile - Valentina Schnitzer
- 2015: Costa Rica - Monica Zamora
- 2015: Peru - Lorena Larriviere

Miss Grand International

- 2018: Cuba - Gladys Carredeguas (Top 21)
- 2020: Paraguay - Daisy Lezcano
- 2024: Curacao - Akisha Albert (Top 20)

Miss All Nations

- 2011: Canada - Camila Gonzalez (Top 11)

Miss Ambar Mundial

- 2015: Cuba - Gladys Carredeguas (Winner)

Miss America Latina del Mundo

- 2014: Nicaragua - Ariadna Orellana

Miss Atlantico Internacional

- 2012: Brazil - Lais Perte

Miss Costa Maya Internacional

- 2013: Nicaragua - Ariadna Orellana (1st RU)

Miss Eco International

- 2016: Brazil - Lais Berte (1st RU)

Miss Globe International

- 2012: Portugal - Tania Rodrigues Costa

Miss Model of the World

- 2012: Paraguay - Daisy Lezcano (Top 36)

Miss Progress International

- 2014: Puerto Rico - Kristina Velez Toledo

Reinado Internacional del Café

- 2017: Bolivia - Katherine Añazgo
- 2017: Canada - Camila Gonzalez

Reinado Internacional de la Ganderia

- 2015: Costa Rica - Monica Zamora

Top Model of the World

- 2014: Curacao - Akisha Albert
