= Vanessa van Arendonk =

Curaçao model

- Born: Vanessa Maria van Arendonk; 22 November 1980 (age 45); Curaçao

Vanessa Maria van Arendonk (born 22 November 1980 in Curaçao) is a Curaçaoan model and beauty pageant titleholder who won Miss Curaçao 2003 and competed in Miss Universe 2003, held in Panama. She was the first Miss Curaçao to have the two most important beauty queen titles of the island under her name: Miss International Curaçao (2001) and Miss Curaçao Universe (2003).

Van Arendonk graduated from Manhattanville College in Purchase, New York.
