= Alexia Viruez =

Bolivian model (born 1994)

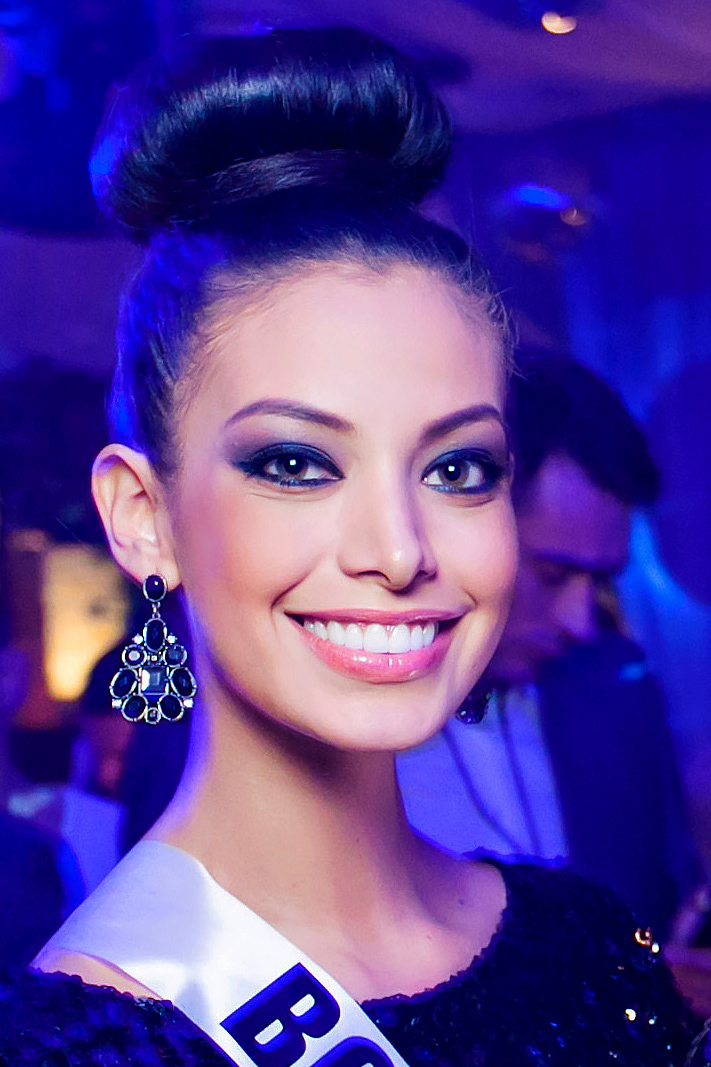
- Born: Alexia Viruez; May 4, 1994 (age 32); Santa Cruz, Bolivia
- Height: 1.79 m (5 ft 10 1/2 in)
- Beauty pageant titleholder
- Title: Miss Bolivia 2012
- Hair color: Black
- Eye color: Green
- Major competitions: Miss Bolivia 2012 (Winner); Reina Hispanoamericana 2012 (1st Runner-Up); Miss Universe 2013

Alexia Viruez (born May 4, 1994) is a Bolivian model and beauty pageant titleholder who was crowned Miss Bolivia 2012 and represented her country in the 2013 Miss Universe.

== Early life ==
On May 4, 1994, Viruez was born in Santa Cruz, Bolivia. Viruez was raised in Santa Cruz, Bolivia. When Viruez was nine years old, Alexia was awarded a modeling scholarship.

== Education ==
Viruez graduated from Nueva America. In 2012, Viruez was studying psychology at Universidad de Aquino Bolivia.

== Career ==
Viruez started her career as a model.

== Pageants ==
=== Miss Bolivia 2012 ===
On May 31, 2012 Viruez competed in the 2012 Miss Universe Bolivia pageant and won. At 18 years old, Viruez was crowned as the 2012 Miss Bolivia. Viruez represented Bolivia at Reina Hispanoamericana 2012 and Miss Universe 2013.

=== Reina Hispanoamericana 2012 ===
Viruez represented Bolivia at Reina Hispanoamericana 2012 in her hometown of Santa Cruz where she finished as 1st Runner-Up.

=== Miss Universe 2013 ===
On November 9, 2013, Viruez represented Bolivia at Miss Universe 2013 in Moscow, Russia. Although considered a favorite and a front runner, she failed to place in the semifinals.

Awards and achievements
Preceded by Yéssica Mouton	Miss Bolivia; 2012	Succeeded by Claudia Tavel
