= Joyce Prado =

Bolivian model (born 1997)

- Born: Marian Joyce Prado Rivera; 1997 (age 28–29)
- Height: 1.75 m (5 ft 9 in)
- Beauty pageant titleholder
- Title: Miss Litoral 2015; Miss Tourism Bolivia 2015; Miss Santa Cruz 2018; Miss Bolivia 2018
- Hair color: Black
- Eye color: Dark Brown
- Major competitions: Miss Tourism Queen of the Year International 2015 (Unplaced); Miss Tourism International 2016 (Top 10); Miss Globe International 2017 (Unplaced); Miss Santa Cruz 2018 (Winner); Miss Bolivia 2018 (Winner); Reina Hispanoamericana 2018 (3rd Runner-up); Miss Universe 2018 (Unplaced)

Marian Joyce Prado Rivera (born 1997) is a Bolivian model and beauty pageant titleholder who won Miss Bolivia 2018. She represented Bolivia at the Miss Universe 2018 pageant. Prado was stripped of her Miss Santa Cruz and Miss Bolivia crowns for 'breach of contract', when she confirmed she was pregnant in April 2019.

== Personal life ==
Prado-Rivera lives in Santa Cruz, Bolivia. She was previously awarding as Miss Tourism Bolivia in 2015. She is professional model and tourism ambassador under the Promociones Gloria, Miss Bolivia Organization. On June 24, 2018, she won Miss Bolivia 2018 and she represented her country at the Miss Universe 2018.

== Achievements ==
- Reina Hispanoamericana 2018 3rd Runner-up
- Miss Universe 2018 Unplaced
- Miss Bolivia 2018
- Miss Santa Cruz 2018
- Miss Tourism International 2016 Top 10
- Miss Tourism Bolivia 2015
- Miss Litoral 2015

Awards and achievements
Preceded by Gleisy Vera Noguer Hassen	Miss Bolivia; 2018	Succeeded by Fabiana Hurtado
Preceded by (Mexico) Karla María López Berumen	Reina Hispanoamericana; 3rd Runner-up; 2018	Succeeded by (Paraguay) Ketlin Lottermann
