= Norayla Francisco =

Accountant and beauty pageant titleholder (born 1984)

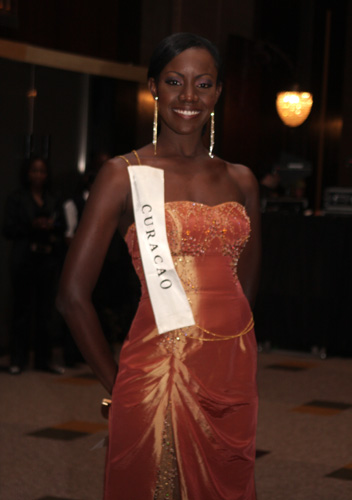
- Born: Norayla Francisco; June 30, 1984 (age 42); Willemstad, Curaçao
- Height: 6 ft 0 in (1.83 m)
- Beauty pageant titleholder
- Title: Miss World Curaçao 2008; Top Model of the World Curaçao 2010; Miss Earth Curaçao 2010
- Hair color: Black
- Eye color: Dark brown
- Major competitions: Miss Curaçao 2008 (Miss World Curaçao); Miss World 2008 (Miss World Top Model Top 10 Finalist); Top Model of the World 2010 (Semifinalist seventh place); Miss Earth 2010

Norayla María Francisco (born June 30, 1984) is a Curaçaon accountant and beauty pageant titleholder who represented Curaçao in Miss World 2008 in South Africa. She won the right to represent the Caribbean island after winning Miss World Curaçao in March 2008. On December 3, 2008, Francisco placed among the top ten finalists at the Miss World 2008 Top Model competition held in Soweto, South Africa.

She also represented Curaçao in Top Model of The World 2010, where she was placed in the Top 15, getting the seventh place.

Celebrating the tenth edition of the Miss Earth beauty pageant, that was held at Vinpearl Land, Nha Trang, Vietnam on December 4, 2010, Norayla Francisco was selected by Reinilla Productions Developments (ReProD) to represent Curaçao. This time she didn't make a placement.

Eighty-four contestants from various countries and territories competed for the Miss Earth 2010 title. At the conclusion of the competition, outgoing titleholder Miss Earth 2009, Larissa Ramos of Brazil crowned her successor Nicole Faria of India. The event was broadcast live by STAR World, VTV, ABS-CBN, The Filipino Channel, and other partner networks.
