= Laura Valenti =

Italian model (born 1984)

- Born: Laura Valenti; 6 February 1984 (age 42); Arezzo; Tuscany, Italy
- Height: 5 ft 9 in (1.75 m)
- Beauty pageant titleholder
- Title: Miss Universo Italia 2009
- Hair color: Burgundy
- Eye color: Brown
- Major competitions: • Miss Universo Italia 2009 (winner) • Miss Universe 2009

Laura Valenti (born 6 February 1984 in Arezzo, Tuscany, Italy) is an Italian model and beauty pageant titleholder who the winner of the Miss Universo Italia 2009 pageant that was held at the Palariccione in Riccione, Emilia-Romagna on 24 May 2009. She represented Italy at the Miss Universe 2009 pageant at the Atlantis Paradise Island, in Nassau, Bahamas on 23 August. Despite a strong showing during the preliminary competition, she failed to place among the semifinalists.

Valenti is 5 ft 9 in (1.75 m) tall. She is a model and a professional dancer who practiced rhythmic gymnastic competitively from 1994 to 1997. She was accepted into the ballet company at the Teatro alla Scala in Milan, taking part in the productions of Swan Lake, The Nutcracker, Giselle, Carmen, La Sylphide, Rigoletto and Cinderella among others. As a model, she has appeared in campaigns for Swarovski and Coin, an Italian luxury goods department store.
