= Yéssica Mouton =

Miss Bolivia 2011

Yessica Mouton Gianella
- Born: January 30, 1988 (age 38); Santa Cruz, Bolivia
- Height: 1.72 m (5 ft 7 1/2 in)
- Beauty pageant titleholder
- Title: Miss Bolivia 2011
- Hair color: Black
- Eye color: Brown
- Major competitions: Miss Bolivia 2011 (Winner); Reina Hispanoamericana 2011 (1st Runner-Up); Miss Universe 2012

Yessica Mouton Gianella (born 30 January 1988) is a Bolivian model and beauty pageant titleholder who was crowned Miss Bolivia 2011, and represented her country in the 2012 Miss Universe.

== Early life ==
Mouton speaks English and Spanish fluently. She is studied Public Relations in Nur. Yessica has participated in competitions since childhood. Yessica Sharit Gianella Mouton became the "Goddess of Fortune" Bingo Bahiti 2010, after the contest was held among 14 candidates in the city.

== Miss Bolivia 2011 ==
Yessica Mouton, Miss Litoral 2011, was named Miss Universe Bolivia, crowned June 30 at the Siriono ball room at the Fexpo in Santa Cruz. She also won the title of Miss Photogenic. Yessica said, "I want to represent our country abroad to show the diverse beauty of Bolivia, a country we are working and creative people".

== Miss Universe 2012 ==
Mouton participated in Miss Universe 2012 pageant held in Las Vegas, Nevada.

Mouton married Gerson Guiteras in 2013; the couple had their first child in 2014.

Awards and achievements
Preceded by Olivia Pinheiro	Miss Bolivia; 2011	Succeeded by Alexia Viruez
