= Ingibjörg Egilsdóttir =

Icelandic model, and beauty queen (born 1985)

- Born: Ingibjörg Egilsdóttir
- Beauty pageant titleholder
- Title: Miss Iceland Universe 2009
- Major competitions: Miss Iceland Universe 2009 (Winner); Miss Universe 2009 (Top 15)

Ingibjörg Ragnheiður Egilsdóttir is an Icelandic model.

Ingibjörg Ragnheiður Egilsdóttir won the Miss Universe Iceland 2009 beauty pageant and thus earned her country's title at the international Miss Universe 2009 pageant, held at Atlantis Paradise Island, Nassau, The Bahamas, on August 23, 2009. The winner of the pageant was Venezuelan Stefanía Fernández, while Iceland's representative placed fifteenth.

Ingibjörg Ragnheiður Egilsdóttir later pursued a career as a model and beauty and cosmetics consultant.
