= Wang Jingyao =

Chinese beauty pageant contestant

- 王静瑶
- Born: Wang Jingyao; September 27, 1990 (age 36); Jinan, Shandong, China
- Height: 1.83 m (6 ft 0 in)
- Beauty pageant titleholder
- Title: Miss China Universe 2009
- Hair color: Black
- Eye color: Black
- Major competition: Miss Universe 2009

Wang Jingyao (simplified Chinese: 王静瑶; traditional Chinese: 王靜瑤; pinyin: Wáng Jìngyáo; usually referred to in the media as Jingyao Wang; born September 27, 1990) is a Chinese model and beauty pageant titleholder.

== Miss Universe 2009 ==
Wang represented China at Miss Universe 2009, which was held at the Atlantis Paradise Island, in Nassau, Bahamas on August 23, 2009. She was chosen as Miss Congeniality by her fellow contestants.
