= Reina Hispanoamericana 2018 =

28th Reina Hispanoamericana pageant

- Date: 3 November 2018
- Venue: Salón Sirionó, Fexpocruz, Santa Cruz de la Sierra, Bolivia
- Entrants: 30
- Placements: 10
- Debuts: Belize
- Withdrawals: Australia
- Returns: Aruba; Europe
- Winner: Nariman Battikha; Venezuela
- Congeniality: Gleidys Leyva; Cuba
- Best National Costume: Lisseth Naranjo; Ecuador
- Photogenic: Aranza Molina; Mexico

Reina Hispanoamericana 2018 was the 28th Reina Hispanoamericana pageant, held at the Salón Sirionó, Fexpocruz in Santa Cruz de la Sierra, Bolivia, on November 3, 2018.

Teresita Ssen Marquez of the Philippines crowned Nariman Battikah of Venezuela as her successor at the end of the event.

== Results ==
=== Placements ===
Placement	Contestant
Reina Hispanoamericana 2018	Venezuela – Nariman Battikha
Virreina Hispanoamericana 2018	Brazil – Isabele Pandini
1st Runner-Up	Mexico – Aranza Molina §
2nd Runner-Up	Paraguay – Belén Alderete
3rd Runner-Up	Bolivia – Joyce Prado
4th Runner-Up	Chile – Camila Helfmann
5th Runner-Up	Ecuador – Lisseth Naranjo
6th Runner-Up	Cuba – Gleidys Leyva
7th Runner-Up	Peru – Jessica McFarlane
8th Runner-Up	Europe – Daniela Santeliz

§ – voted into the Top 10 by viewers

=== Order of Announcements ===
Top 10

1. Mexico
2. Venezuela
3. Brazil
4. Bolivia
5. Paraguay
6. Chile
7. Cuba
8. Peru
9. Ecuador
10. Europe

== Hispanic Beauty Gala ==
Final results	Country
Amazonas Girl	Brazil – Isabele Pandini
Most Beautiful Lips	Mexico – Aranza Molina
Best Hair	Uruguay – Florencia Barrios
Best Smile	Bolivia – Joyce Prado
Best Costume	Ecuador – Lisseth Naranjo
Miss Sports	Brazil – Isabele Pandini
Miss Elegant Face	Mexico – Aranza Molina
Miss Personality	Europe – Daniela Santeliz
Miss Photogenic	Mexico – Aranza Molina
Miss Silueta Philips	Paraguay – Belen Alderete
Miss Congeniality	Cuba – Gleidys Leyva

== Contestants ==
Thirty contestants competed for the title. They are:

Country/Territory	Name
Argentina	Maria Irigaray
Aruba	Raquelle Elina Rosalia Reeberg
Belize	Selene Maria Urias
Bolivia	Marian Joyce Prado Ribera
Brazil	Isabele Pandini Nogueira
Canada	Rafaella Enderica Peña
Chile	Camila Ignacia Helfmann Pastene
Colombia	Alma Beatriz Díaz Bonilla
Costa Rica	Daniela Johnson Quirós
Cuba	Gleidys Leyva Rodríguez
Curacao	Dailin Viera
Dominican Republic	Johanny Estefanía Ureña Billa
Ecuador	Lisseth Estefanía Naranjo Goya
El Salvador	Icela Trinidad Aparicio Villegas
Europe	Daniela Santeliz
Guatemala	Dulce Tatiana López Villatoro
Haiti	Cristina Cadet Prosper
Honduras	Laurien Daniela Villafranca Gamero
Mexico	Aranza Anaid Molina Rueda
Nicaragua	Alicia Karina Ramírez Urbina
Panama	Norma Angélica Díaz Mancilla
Paraguay	María Belén Alderete Gayoso
Philippines	Micaella Alyssa Muhlach Alvarez
Portugal	Ana Rita Aguiar
Puerto Rico	Erika Medina Batista
Spain	Magnolia María Martínez Ortuño
United States	Geraldine Alexandra Chaparro Briceño
Uruguay	Florencia Barrios Rüsch
Venezuela	Nariman Cristina Battikha Yanyi

== Notes ==
Debuts

- Belize

Returns

Last competed in 2015:

- Aruba

Last competed in 2016:

- Europe

Withdrawals

- Australia Cindy Guevara is one of the contestants but she withdrew because of unknown reasons.

Designations

- Mexico Aranza Molina was designated by Lupita Jones who is the national director of Mexicana Universal. Aranza Molina is the 1st runner-up in Mexicana Universal 2018.

Replacements

- Costa Rica Ivonne Cerdas was the original representative of Costa Rica in Reina Hispanoamericana 2018 but because of the change of plans, Daniela Johnson elected as the representative of Costa Rica in Reina Hispanoamericana 2018.
- Dominican Republic Onelly Rosario declined to participate for unknown reasons. She was replaced by Johanna Ureña.
- Paraguay Ana Livieres resigned due to personal issues. Belén Alderete had been elected. Belén Alderete also won the title of Miss Universo Paraguay 2018.
- Nicaragua Geyssell García would be the representative of Nicaragua but after having participated in the Face of Beauty International 2018 in which she was a Second Finalist, the contract with the aforementioned contest did not allow her to participate in another contest until the year of her reign. She was replaced by Alicia Ramírez.

== Crossovers ==
These are the contestants who previously competed or will be competing at other international beauty pageants:

Miss Universe

- 2018: Bolivia Joyce Prado
- 2018: Paraguay Belen Alderete

Miss International

- 2019: Portugal Ana Rita Aguiar

Miss Supranational

- 2018: Venezuela Nariman Battikha (Top 10)
- 2022: Portugal Ana Rita Aguiar

Miss Grand International

- 2022: Ecuador Lisseth Naranjo
- 2025: Venezuela Nariman Battikha (4th RU)

Miss Model of the World

- 2015: Bolivia Joyce Prado

Miss Tourism Queen of the Year International

- 2015: Bolivia Joyce Prado (semifinalist)

Miss Pacific World

- 2015: Argentina Maria Irigaray

Miss Intercontinental

- 2016: El Salvador Icela Aparicio

Reinado Internacional del Café

- 2017: Panama Norma Diaz (2nd princess)

Miss Latin Tourism

- 2018: Peru Jessica McFarlane (Virreina)

Miss Global Beauty Queen

- 2016: Brazil Isabella Pandini (3rd RU)
