= Paola Vintimilla =

Ecuadorian politician

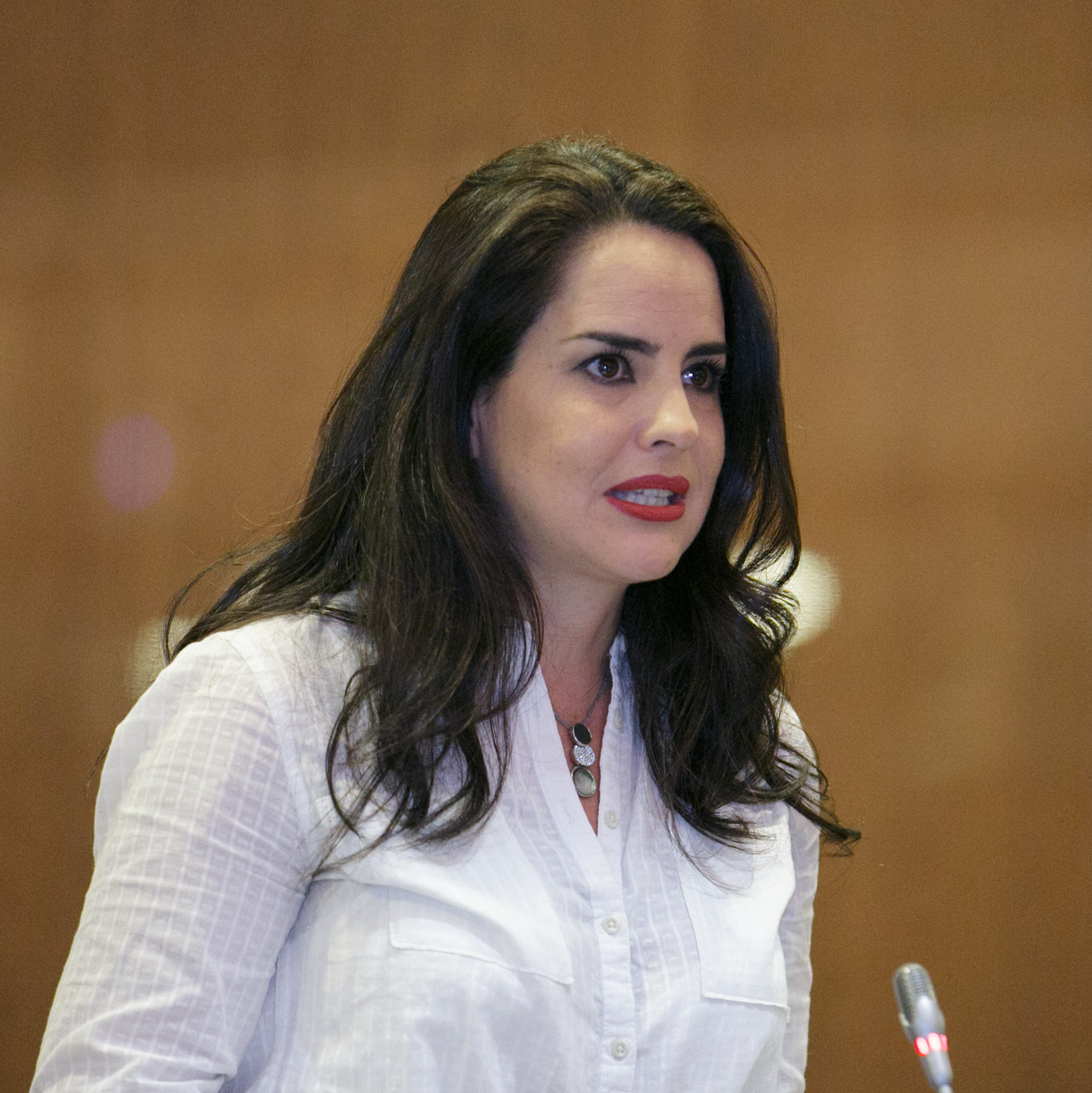
- in 2018
- Born: Paola Vintimilla Moscoso; 29 August 1971 (age 54); Quito
- Children: four

Paola Vintimilla Moscoso (born August 29, 1971) is an Ecuadorian model who became a TV presenter and a member of Ecuador's National Assembly. She then returned to being a TV presenter working for the company whose live broadcast was taken over by an armed gang.

== Life ==
Vintimilla was born in Quito in 1971. At the age of 19 she was a model for television commercials. In 1991, she entered and won the Reina de Quito beauty contest. In 1993 she was in the Miss Ecuador pageant, and this allowed her to represent Ecuador in the Reina Sudamericana contest. She continued to volunteer for the Reina de Quito foundation for many years.

Vintimilla became a television presenter. She got her first opportunity on the morning program Complicidades, on Ecuavisa, in which she worked alongside Marco Ponce and Yolanda Torres from the studios in the city of Quito for three years. Later she moved to Guayaquil and became a news presenter for Telesistema.

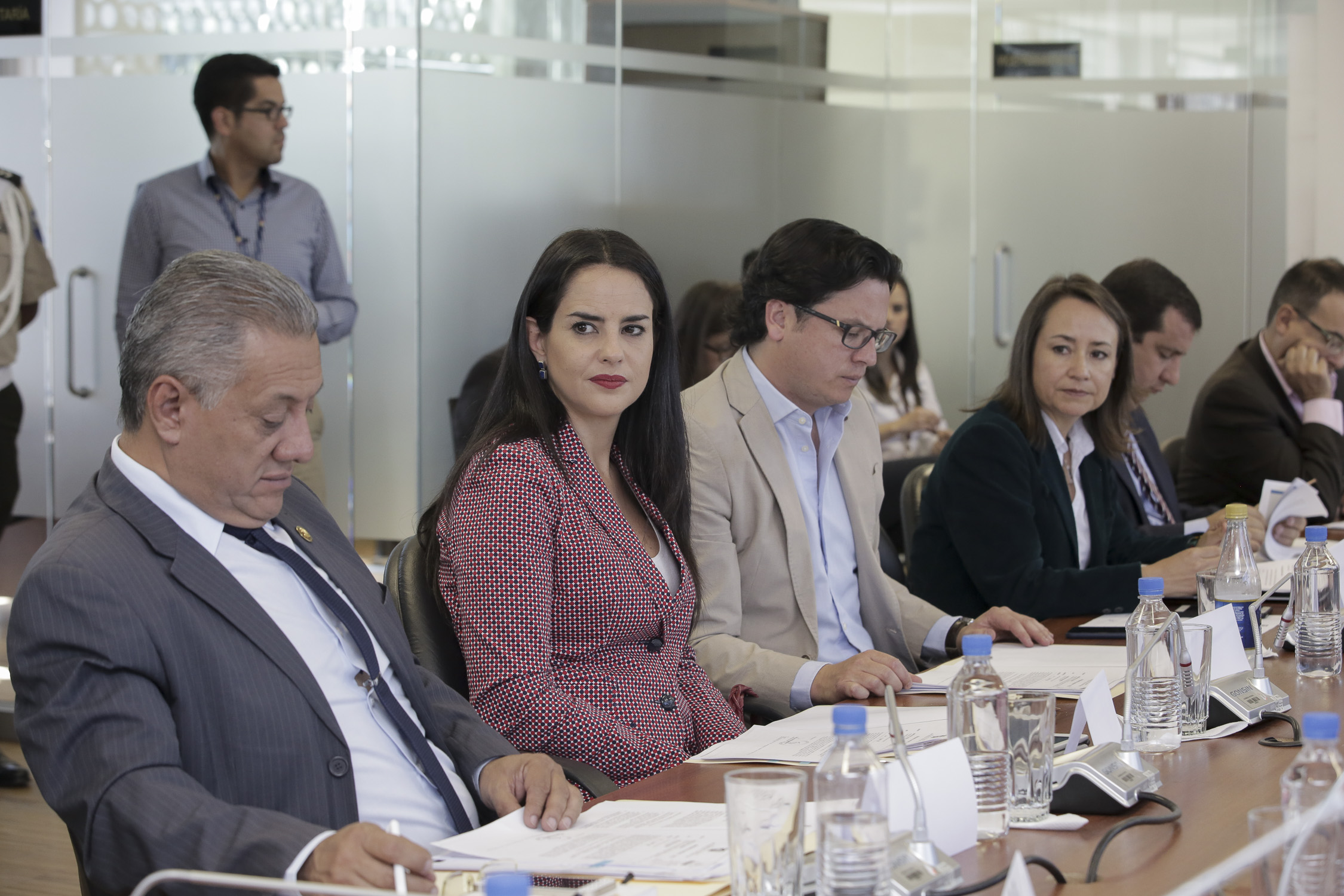
Paola Vintimilla attending the National Assembly's International Relations Commission in 2017

In June 2016, he began conversations with Jaime Nebot, leader of the Social Christian Party, and in August he joined La Unidad. Her qualifications for standing for election were questioned when she appeared third on the party's list.

Vintimilla was elected to the National Assembly and she made a point about the irregularities in the process that gave Julian Assange his Ecuadorian nationality. She resigned from her seat to run for mayor of Quito.

In 2019 she was an unsuccessful candidate for Mayor of Quito representing the Social Christian Party.

Vintimilla returned to TV presenting news for the state TV station TC Televisión. She was working for the station when it made international news when its live broadcast was taken over by an armed gang on 9 January 2024.

== Private life ==
She is married and she has four children.
