= Olivia Pinheiro =

Bolivian beauty queen (born 1983)

- Born: María Olivia Pinheiro Menacho; October 29, 1983 (age 42); Andrés Ibáñez, Santa Cruz, Bolivia
- Occupation: Model
- Height: 1.75 m (5 ft 9 in)
- Beauty pageant titleholder
- Title: Miss Bolivia 2010
- Hair color: Brown
- Eye color: Green
- Major competitions: Miss Bolivia 2010 (Winner); Reina Hispanoamericana 2010 (3rd place) (Best Hair) (Miss Photogenic); Miss Universe 2011 (Unplaced); Miss Caraïbes Hibiscus 2011 (Winner) (Best Body)

María Olivia Pinheiro Menacho (born October 29, 1983) is a Bolivian beauty pageant titleholder and model who was crowned Miss Bolivia 2010, and represented her country in the 2011 Miss Universe pageant. Pinheiro declined to participate in the international competition after rumors about her real age were revealed to the press.

== Early life ==
Born in Andrés Ibáñez, Santa Cruz, Bolivia, to a Brazilian father – hence her fluent Portuguese – and a Bolivian mother (namely José Carlos Pinheiro and Cotty Menacho), Pinheiro started her pageant career in 1999 when, after just turning 16 years old, she represented her country at Miss Model of the World in Turkey and then a year later participated in Queen of the World 2000 in Germany, placing among the Top 10 semifinalists. It's then when Promociones Gloria, organizers of Miss Bolivia, named her Modelo Revelación 2000.

A year later, Pinheiro participated and became one of the favorites at International Queen of Flowers 2001 in Colombia, a pageant that was eventually won by Lilián Villanueva of Mexico. In 2002, she participated in her fourth international competition, Miss Intercontinental in Germany and a year later, represented Bolivia in her fifth contest, International Female Model 2003 in Aruba.

She's also worked as a model in her native Bolivia for the past decade and has been elected Queen of Comparsa at Santa Cruz de la Sierra's carnival celebrations twice: at age 16 as Queen of Chirapas Jrs. 2000 and at age 20 as Queen of Tremendazos 2004.

== Miss Bolivia ==
Pinheiro, who stands 1.75 m (5 ft 9 in) tall, competed as Miss Santa Cruz against 18 other delegates in her country's national pageant, Miss Bolivia, held in Santa Cruz de la Sierra on August 26, 2010, where she became the eventual winner of the title and was crowned by outgoing titleholder Claudia Arce, gaining the right to represent Bolivia in the 2011 Miss Universe pageant, to be broadcast live from São Paulo, Brazil on September 12, 2011. However, Olivia Pinheiro lied about her age, stating she was 24 years old. Journalist, Carlos Valverde, got hold of her original and fake birth certificates. In January 2011, Olivia Pinheiro declined her participation in Miss Universe 2011 due "to personal reasons", however she never answered to questions relating to her real age. Promociones Gloria, owner of Miss Universe franchise in Bolivia, announced that the winner of Miss Bolivia 2011 would participate in Miss Universe 2011. Notwithstanding, in June 2011, Olivia Pinheiro and Promociones Gloria announced that Olivia would remain the Bolivian representative to Miss Universe 2011.

== Reina Hispanoamericana 2010 ==
After winning Miss Bolivia, Pinheiro represented her country in Reina Hispanoamericana 2010 held in her native Santa Cruz de la Sierra on November 24, 2010, where she obtained the Photogenic and Best Hair awards, placing third overall.

== Miss Universe 2011 ==
On January 27, 2011, Pinheiro said she wouldn't participate in Miss Universe 2011 "for personal reasons", after persistent rumors about her real age. Miss Universe contestants must be at least 18 years old and under 27 years of age by February 1 in the year they participate. Pinheiro apparently turned 27 in October 2010 and would be ineligible to compete.

Gloria Suárez de Limpias, president of Promociones Gloria and organizer of Miss Bolivia, announced Pinheiro remains Miss Bolivia 2010 and will crown her successor in June 2011. As a result of the controversy, Bolivia's representative to the Miss Universe pageant will be the winner of Miss Bolivia 2011.

== Miss Caraïbes Hibiscus 2011 ==
After her participation in Miss Universe; without any success, Olivia participated in November 2011 in the beauty pageant Miss Caraïbes Hibiscus 2011, where she won the crown, besides of the title of Best Body. Being the first time that Bolivia won this pageant.

Awards and achievements
| Preceded by Claudia Arce | Miss Bolivia; 2010 | Incumbent |
| Preceded by Claudia Arce | Miss Bolivia Universo; 2011 | Succeeded by Yéssica Mouton |
Incumbent
| Preceded by Flavia Foianini | Miss Bolivia Hispanoamericana; 2010 | Incumbent |
