= Akisha Albert =

Beauty queen

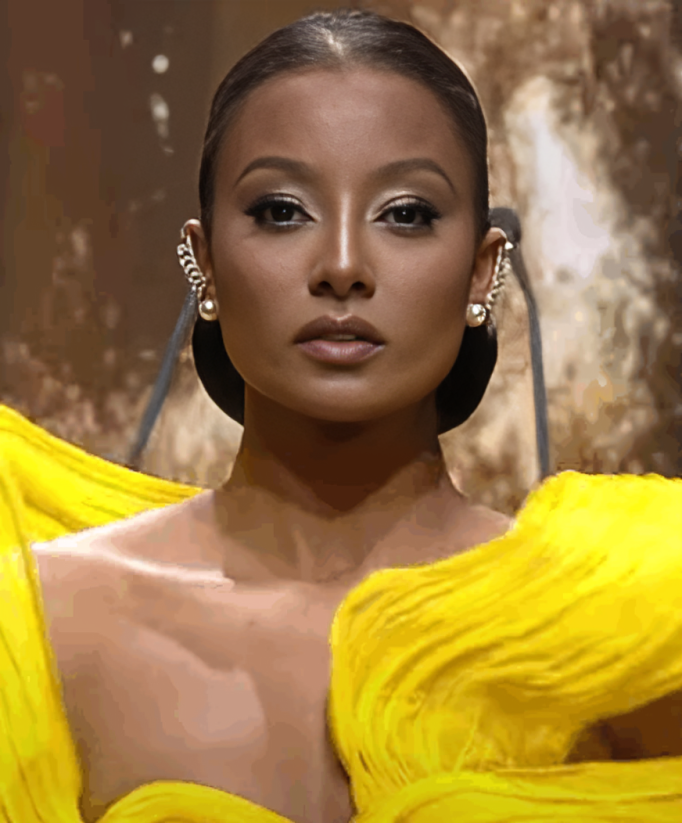
- Albert in 2024
- Born: Willemstad, Curaçao
- Height: 1.75 m (5 ft 9 in)
- Beauty pageant titleholder
- Title: Virreina Hispanoamericana 2017; Miss Curaçao 2018; Miss Grand Curaçao 2024
- Hair color: Black
- Eye color: Brown
- Major competitions: Miss Earth 2014 (Unplaced); Reina Hispanoamericana 2017; (Virreina Hispanoamericana); Miss Curaçao 2018; (Winner); Miss Universe 2018; (Top 10); Miss Grand International 2024; (5th Runner Up; Assumed)

Akisha Albert is a Curaçaoan beauty pageant titleholder who represented Curaçao at Reina Hispanoamericana and was first runner-up. As the winner of the 2018 Miss Universe Curaçao pageant, she entered Miss Universe 2018 and finished in the top 10. She represented Curaçao at Miss Grand International 2024, where she finished in the top 20 (later assumed top 10).

== Pageantry ==
=== Miss Curaçao Teenager 2012 ===
Albert entered Miss Curaçao Teenager 2012.

=== Miss Curaçao World 2014 ===
Albert entered Miss Curaçao World 2014 and was first runner up, winning the Miss Earth Curaçao title. She also won the Top Model of the World. As Miss Earth Curaçao, she entered Miss Earth 2014, and was unplaced.

=== Reina Hispanoamericana 2017 ===
Albert was selected by Coridja Stars Productions to represent Curaçao at the Reina Hispanoamericana 2017 in Bolivia, and was first runner-up.

=== Miss Universe Curaçao 2018 ===
On September 9, 2018, Albert won Miss Curaçao 2018 at the World Trade Center, Curaçao, competing against six other contestants. She also won the title of Miss Elegance and was first runner-up at the Miss Playa (beachwear) competition.

=== Miss Universe 2018 ===
Albert represented Curaçao at Miss Universe 2018 and reached the top 10.

=== Miss Grand International 2024 ===
Albert represented Curaçao at Miss Grand International 2024, in Thailand. She reached the top 20 (later assumed 5th runner up/top 10).

Awards and achievements
Preceded by Kanisha Sluis	Miss Grand Curaçao; 2024	Incumbent
Preceded by Nashaira Balentien	Miss Curaçao; 2018	Succeeded by Kyrsha Attaf
Preceded by (Mexico) Magdalena Chiprés	Virreina Hispanoamericana; 2017	Succeeded by (Brazil) Isabela Pandini
Preceded by Archangela Garcia	Miss Earth Curacao; 2014	Succeeded by Alexandra Atalita
Preceded by Eugenia Das Neves; Skarxi Marte; Ritassya Wellgreat; Melissa Bottema; Thaweeporn Phingchamrat	5th Runner up Miss Grand International; 2024	Succeeded by (Colombia) Laura Ramos (Czech Republic) Markéta Mörwicková (Guatemala) Ana-Sofía Lendl (Mexico) Monserrat Villalva (Tanzania) Beatrice Alex
