= Romina Rocamonje =

Bolivian model and beauty pageant titleholder

- Born: September 21, 1992 (age 33)
- Education: Universidad Autónoma del Beni
- Occupations: Model and beauty pageant titleholder
- Known for: Miss Bolivia 2014

Romina Rocamonje Fuentes (born September 21, 1992) is a Bolivian model and beauty pageant titleholder who was crowned Miss Bolivia 2014 and represented her country at the Miss Universe 2015 pageant. She also represented her country in Miss Supranational 2017 where she placed as one of the Top 25 semi-finalists.

== Personal life ==
Romina is a student of Veterinary and Animal Science at Universidad Autónoma del Beni. She was starting a career as a model when she was crowned Miss Beni 2013 and represented her region at Miss Bolivia 2014.

=== Miss Bolivia 2014 ===
On July 31, 2014, Romina was crowned Miss Bolivia 2014 in Santa Cruz de la Sierra, Bolivia. The pageant awarded the six contestants the opportunity to represent Bolivia at international beauty pageants in 2014 and 2015. Romina, as the grand winner of Miss Bolivia 2014, was awarded as Miss Universe Bolivia 2015.

=== Reina Hispanoamericana 2014 ===
On November 1, 2014, Romina was crowned Reina Hispanoamericana 2014 out of 24 contestants in the city of Santa Cruz de la Sierra, Bolivia. The pageant was broadcast by Unitel in Bolivia.

=== Miss Universe 2015 ===
As Miss Universe Bolivia 2015, Rocamonje competed in the Miss Universe 2015 pageant, held in Las Vegas, United States on December 20, 2015. She did not place.

=== Miss Supranational 2017 ===
Rocamonje represented her country in Miss Supranational 2017 where she placed as one of the Top 25 semi-finalists. She is the very first Bolivian to gain a placement in Miss Supranational.

Awards and achievements
Preceded by Claudia Tavel	Miss Bolivia; 2014	Succeeded by Paula Schneider
Preceded by (Colombia) María Alejandra López	Reina Hispanoamericana; 2014	Succeeded by (Spain) Sofía del Prado Prieto
