= Estefany Rivero =

Bolivian model and beauty pageant titleholder

- Born: December 26, 1996 (age 29); Trinidad, Beni, Bolivia
- Occupation: Model
- Height: 5 ft 10 in (1.78 m)
- Beauty pageant titleholder
- Title: Miss Bolivia 2023
- Hair color: Brown
- Major competitions: Miss Bolivia 2023 (Winner); Miss Universe 2023 (Unplaced)

María Estefany Rivero Giesse (born December 26, 1996) is a Bolivian architect, model and beauty pageant titleholder who was crowned Miss Bolivia 2023. She represented Bolivia at the Miss Universe 2023

== Biography ==
Estefany Rivero was born in Trinidad, Beni, Bolivia on 1996. she is an architect and interior decorator.

== Pageantry ==
=== Miss Bolivia 2023 ===
She participated in Miss Bolivia 2023, representing Miss Beni, after the contest she was crowned Miss Bolivia 2023. She represented Bolivia at the Miss Universe 2023 held in El Salvador.

Awards and achievements
Preceded by María Camila Sanabria Pereyra	Miss Bolivia; 2023	Succeeded by Juliana Barrientos
