= Claudia Tavel =

Bolivian beauty pageant titleholder and model

- Born: Claudia Tavel Antelo; March 11, 1989 (age 37); Santa Cruz, Bolivia
- Height: 1.73 m (5 ft 8 in)
- Beauty pageant titleholder
- Title: Miss Bolivia 2013
- Hair color: Black
- Major competitions: Miss Bolivia 2013 (Winner); Reina Hispanoamericana 2013 (6th runner-up); Miss Universe 2014 (Unplaced)

Claudia Tavel Antelo (born March 11, 1989) is a Bolivian beauty pageant titleholder and model who was crowned Miss Bolivia 2013 and represented her country at Miss Universe 2014.

== Early life ==
Tavel lived in the neighborhood of Santa Cruz Pan and she studied at the Bolivian Argentine School and for six years she joined the ballet Santa Cruz and interested in folklore.

== Pageantry ==
=== Miss Bolivia 2013 ===
Claudia Tavel Antelo was crowned Miss Bolivia Universe 2014 during the gala finals of the Miss Bolivia 2013 pageant held at the Siriono Hall of Fexpo on June 13.

=== Reina Hispanoamericana 2013 ===
Tavel was chosen as Bolivian representative at Reina Hispanoamericana 2013 in Santa Cruz, Bolivia.

=== Miss Universe 2014 ===
Tavel competed at Miss Universe 2014 but Unplaced.

Awards and achievements
Preceded by Alexia Viruez	Miss Bolivia; 2013	Succeeded by Romina Rocamonje
