= Evalina van Putten =

Curaçaoan beauty queen (born 1992)

- Born: Willemstad, Curaçao
- Occupation: Model
- Height: 1.81 m (5 ft 11 1/2 in)
- Beauty pageant titleholder
- Title: Miss Curaçao 2011
- Hair color: Black
- Eye color: Brown
- Major competitions: Miss Curaçao Universe 2011 (Winner); Miss Universe 2011 (Unplaced); Reina Hispanoamericana 2011 (Winner)

Evalina van Putten (born 1992) is a Curaçaoan beauty pageant titleholder who was crowned Miss Curaçao 2011 and Reina Hispanoamericana 2011 and also represented her country in Miss Universe 2011.

== Pageants ==
Van Putten competed in Curaçao's national beauty pageant, Miss Curaçao, held in Willemstad. She finished as the 1st finalist, behind winner Monifa Jansen, who did not meet the age requirement to participate in Miss Universe 2011. Van Putten went instead and placed as Top 5 in the best National Costume category.

Awards and achievements
Preceded by (Venezuela) Caroline Medina	Reina Hispanoamericana; 2011	Succeeded by (Haiti) Sarodj Bertin
Preceded by Safira de Wit	Miss Curaçao; 2011-2012	Succeeded by Monifa Jansen
