= Dominique Peltier =

Bolivian model (born 1986)

- Born: Rosa Dominique Noemí Peltier De Liota; 22 August 1986 (age 40); Cochabamba, Bolivia
- Height: 1.80 m (5 ft 11 in)
- Beauty pageant titleholder
- Title: Miss Bolivia Universo 2008
- Major competitions: Miss Bolivia 2008 (Winner); Miss Universe 2009 (Unplaced); Reina Hispanoamericana 2008 (2nd Runner-up)

Rosa Dominique Noemí Peltier De Liota (born 22 August 1986 in Cochabamba) best known as Dominique Peltier is a Bolivian model and beauty pageant titleholder who won the Miss Bolivia Universo 2008 during the Miss Bolivia 2008 pageant on 19 July 2008. She represented her home country Bolivia at the Miss Universe 2009 pageant at the Atlantis Paradise Island, in Nassau, Bahamas on August 23, 2009. Dominique did not enter the 15 semi-finalists. She represented Bolivia in Reina Hispanoamericana 2008 and was placed as a finalist.

Preceded by Katherine David	Miss Bolivia; 2009	Succeeded by Claudia Arce
Preceded by Andrea Peñarrieta	Miss Continente Americano Bolivia; 2011	Succeeded by Incumbent
