= Miss Curaçao =

National beauty pageant competition in Curaçao

The Curaçao Beauty Pageant Committee
- Formation: 1962; 64 years ago
- Type: Beauty pageant
- Headquarters: Willemstad
- Location: Curaçao
- Members: Miss Universe
- Official language: Papiamentu
- Franchise holder: Curaçao Beauty Pageant Committee (CBPC)
- Key people: Ayshel Maria
- Website: coridjastars.com

The Miss Curaçao (In Papiamentu: Miss Kòrsou) is a national beauty pageant in Curaçao. This pageant is unrelated to the Señorita Curaçao or Miss International Curaçao pageant.

== History ==
The pageant started in 1963 and sends contestants to the Miss World and Miss Universe pageants. The organization started with the creation of the Curaçao Youth Beauty Contest Organization (CYBECO).

Between 1997 and 2006 Sheida Wever, former Miss Curaçao 1985 who went to compete to the Miss Universe pageant that same year, organized the national pageant and was the national director for both Miss World and Miss Universe.

In 2006, Reinilla Productions Developments (ReProD) obtained the Miss World, Miss Intercontinental, Top Model of the World and Miss Earth franchise for Curaçao. Their first delegate was Fyrena Martha who competed in Miss World 2006 in Poland. In 2007 and 2008, ReProD in association with Sanjess Promotions held a joint pageant where the Miss Universe and Miss World representative were selected. Since 2009 the event is independent to Miss Universe Curaçao.

Since 2006, the Curaçao Tourism Board holds the Miss Universe franchise and every year they have a bidding to choose who is going to organize the Miss Curaçao Universe pageant, Sanjess Promotions run by Jearmeane Colastica organized it in 2007 and 2008.

Smaller pageants had been held to select contestants to Miss International, until 2002 by Richard Isa.

In 2008, the Curaçao Beauty Organization presided by Aubrey America won the bid to organize the pageant jointly with Hart & Private Productions. The winner of Miss Universe Curaçao represents the island in Miss Universe.

In 2011, Evalina van Putten won Reina Hispanoamericana 2011 in Bolivia. This was first time Curaçao winning the title.

In 2013, after a long time of speculating about the Miss Universe Curaçao pageant, Coridja Stars Productions got the license to organize the most important pageant of the island.

In 2018 the Curaçao Beauty Pageant Committee took the franchise of Miss Universe, together with Miss World, Miss International and Miss Earth.

== Miss Universe license holder in Curaçao ==
- Curaçao Youth Beauty Contest Organization (CYBECO) (1963–1984)
- Curaçao Youth Beauty Contest Organization (CYBECO), under Richard John Isa (1985–1996)
- Sheida Wever (1997–2005)
- Curaçao Tourism Board (2006)
- Sanjess Promotion, under Jearmeane Colastica (2007)
- Curaçao Beauty, under Aubrey America (2008–2012)
- Coridja Stars Productions, under Corinne Djaoen-Genaro (2013–2017)
- Curaçao BP Committee, under Ayshel Maria (2018—present)

== Titleholders ==
Year	Miss Curaçao
1962	Peggy Van Riet
1963	Lemão Negão Apenas
1964	Lucas Dias Baratella Paula
1965	Ninfa Palm
1966	Elizabeth Sánchez
1967	Imelda Thodé
1968	Anne Marie Braafheid
1969	Yvonne Wardekker
1970	Nilva Maduro
1971	Maria Vonhogen
1972	Ingrid Prade
1973	Ingeborg Zielinski
1974	Catherine de Jongh
1975	Yasmin Fraites
1976	Anneke Dijkhuizen
1977	Regine Tromp
1978	Solange de Castro
1980	Hassana Hammoud
1981	Maria Maxima Croes
1982	Minerva Hieroms
1983	Maybeline Snel
1984	Susanne Verbrugge
1985	Sheida Wever
1986	Christine Sibilo
1988	Anushka Cova
1989	Anna Maria de Windt
1990	Jacqueline Josien Krijger
1991	Mijanou de Paula
1992	Elsa Roozendal
1993	Jasmin Clifton
1994	Maruschka Jansen
1995	Vanessa Dorinda Mambi
1996	Verna Vasquez
1997	Natacha Tamara Bloem
1998	Jouraine Gregoria Ricardo
1999	Jozaine Marianella Wall
2000	Fatima Maria Sint Jago
2002	Ayanette Statia
2003	Vanessa van Arendonk
2005	Rychacviana Coffie
2007	Naemi Elizabeth Monte
2008	Jenyfeer Natividad Mercelina
2009	Ashanta Mafalda Macauly; Dethroned
2010	Safira de Wit
2011	Evalina van Putten
2012	Monifa Jansen
2013	Eline de Pool
2014	Laurien Angelista
2015	Kanisha Sluis
2016	Chanelle De Lau
2017	Nashaira Balentien
2018	Akisha Albert
2019	Kyrsha Attaf
2020	Chantal Wiertz
2021	Shariëngela Cijntje
2022	Gabriëla Dos Santos
2023	Kim Rossen
2024	Kimberly de Boer
2025	Camille Sabina Thomas
2026	Bianty Gomperts

== Titleholders under Miss Curaçao org. ==
=== Miss Universe Curaçao ===
- : Declared as Winner
- : Ended as runner-up or top 5/6 qualification
- : Ended as one of the finalists or semifinalists
- : Ended as special awards winner

Since 1963 traditionally the winner of Miss Universe Curaçao represents her country at Miss Universe. On occasion, when the winner does not qualify (due to age) for either contest, a runner-up is sent. Curaçao had sent contestants to Miss Universe since 1963 with Philomena Zielinki, the second Miss Curaçao. Of all the 48 representatives from the island, 8 of them have placed in the semifinals.

Year	Miss Curaçao	Placement at Miss Universe	Special awards
2026	Bianty Gomperts	TBA	
2025	Camille Sabina Thomas	Unplaced	
2024	Kimberly de Boer	Unplaced	
2023	Kim Rossen	Unplaced	
2022	Gabriëla Dos Santos	Top 5	
2021	Shariëngela Cijntje	Unplaced	
2020	Chantal Wiertz	Top 21	
2019	Kyrsha Attaf	Unplaced	
2018	Akisha Albert	Top 10	
2017	Nashaira Balentien	Unplaced	
2016	Chanelle De Lau	Unplaced	
2015	Kanisha Sluis	Top 10	
2014	Laurien Angelista	Unplaced	
2013	Eline de Pool	Unplaced	
2012	Monifa Jansen	Unplaced	
2011	Evalina van Putten	Unplaced	Best National Costume (4th Runner-up)
2010	Safira de Wit	Unplaced	
2009	Angenie Simon	Unplaced	
2008	Jenyfeer Mercelina	Unplaced	
2007	Naemi Monte	Unplaced	
2006	Did not compete		
2005	Rychacviana Coffie	Unplaced	
2004	Angeline Da Silva	Unplaced	
2003	Vanessa van Arendonk	Unplaced	
2002	Ayanette Statia	Unplaced	
2001	Fatima St. Jago	Unplaced	
2000	Did not compete		
1999	Jouraine Ricardo	Unplaced	
1998	Natacha Bloem	Unplaced	
1997	Verna Vasquez	Top 6	
1996	Vanessa Mambi	Unplaced	
1995	Maruschka Jansen	Unplaced	
1994	Jasmin Clifton	Unplaced	
1993	Elsa Roozendal	Unplaced	
1992	Mijanou de Paula	Unplaced	
1991	Jacqueline Krijger	Top 10	
1990	Did not compete		
1989	Anna Mosteiro	Unplaced	
1988	Did not compete		
1987	Viennaline Arvelo	Unplaced	
1986	Christine Sibilo	Unplaced	
1985	Sheida Wever	Unplaced	
1984	Susanne Verbrugge	Unplaced	
1983	Maybeline Snel	Unplaced	
1982	Minerva Hierons	Unplaced	
1981	Maria Maxima Croes	Unplaced	
1980	Hassana Hammoud	Unplaced	
1979	Did not compete		
1978	Solange de Castro	Unplaced	
1977	Regine Tromp	Unplaced	
1976	Anneke Dijkhuizen	Top 12	
1975	Jamine Fraites	Unplaced	
1974	Catherine de Jongh	Unplaced	
1973	Ingeborg Zielinski	Unplaced	
1972	Ingrid Prade	Unplaced	
1971	Maria Vonhogen	Unplaced	
1970	Nilva Maduro	Unplaced	
1969	Yvonne Wardekker	Unplaced	
1968	Annemarie Braafheid	1st Runner-up	
1967	Imelda Thodé	Unplaced	
1966	Elizabeth Sánchez	Unplaced	Miss Congeniality
1965	Ninfa Palm	Unplaced	
1964	Iris Anette de Windt	Unplaced	
1963	Philomena Zielinski	Unplaced	
