= Miss International Curaçao =

Beauty pageant

- Formation: 1971
- Type: Beauty pageant
- Headquarters: Willemstad
- Location: Curaçao
- Members: Miss International
- Official language: Dutch
- Key people: Christhian Puesan

Miss International Curaçao is the national female beauty pageant of Curaçao, along with Miss Curaçao and Señorita Curaçao.

== History ==
Miss International Curaçao was held for the first time in 2014. The pageant was held in separate pageant since 2002 Miss Curaçao was stopped to send the delegate at the Miss International pageant. Curaçao was debuted at the Miss International occurred in 1971. Usually the winner, a runner-up or hand-picked delegate is sent as the national representative. Since 2003, the country did not send a candidate at the pageant in unknown reasons. In 2014, Curaçao was represented by Chimay Ramos. Chimay Ramos replaces Kimberly Regales who was originally elected Miss Curaçao International on April 30, 2014. After 3 years of not participating at the Miss International pageant, Curaçao returns with Christhian Puesan as new owner of the license and appointed a former Miss Curaçao Universe, Chanelle de Lau, who end up 1st Runner-Up in Miss International 2017.

== Titleholders ==
Color key

- Declared as Winner
- Ended as runner-up
- Ended as one of the finalists or semifinalists

Year	Miss International Curaçao	Placement	Special Awards
1971	Imelda Thodé	Unplaced	Miss Friendship
Did not compete between 1972 - 1996
1997	Jadira Suleika Bislick	Unplaced	
1998	Santa Indris Tokaay	Unplaced	
1999	Pamela Winkel	Top 10	
2000	Roselle Angèle Augusta	Unplaced	
2001	Venessa Arendonk	Unplaced	
2002	Luz Thonysha De Souza	Unplaced	
Did not compete between 2003 - 2013
2014	Chimay Ramos	Unplaced	
Did not compete between 2015 - 2016
2017	Chanelle De Lau	1st Runner-up	
2018	Diona Angela	Unplaced	Miss Perfect Body
Did not compete between 2019 - 2025
2026	Samiah Booi	TBA	
