= Reinado Internacional del Café 2017 =

- Date: January 7, 2017
- Presenters: Marcelo del Pino; Daniella Álvarez
- Venue: Teatro Los Fundadores, Manizales, Colombia
- Broadcaster: Telecafé
- Entrants: 28
- Placements: 5
- Withdrawals: Aruba, Haiti, Panama
- Winner: Marilú Acevedo; Mexico

Reinado Internacional del Café 2017 (International Coffee Queen) beauty pageant, was held in Manizales, Colombia, on January 7, 2017. At the end of the event, the outgoing queen Maydeliana Díaz, Reina Internacional del Café 2016 from Venezuela crowned Marilú Acevedo from Mexico as her successor.

== Results ==
Placement	Contestant
Reina Internacional del Café 2017	Mexico – Marilú Acevedo
Virreina Internacional del Café	Honduras – Kerelyne Campigotti
1st Princess	Italy – Sara Croce
2nd Princess	Brazil – Francielly Ouriques
3rd Princess	Venezuela – Ana Cristina Díaz

== Special awards ==
Award	Contestant
Best Legs	Brazil – Francielly Ouriques
Best Hair	Brazil – Francielly Ouriques
Best Face	Poland – Magdalena Wesołowska
Queen of Social Media	Puerto Rico – Ciara Rosendo

=== Queen of Police ===
Award	Contestant
Winner	Puerto Rico – Ciara Rosendo
Top 5	Brazil – Francielly Ouriques; Honduras – Kerelyne Campigotti; Paraguay – Alma Villagra; Uruguay – Wendy Lehmann

== Contestants ==
Country	Contestant	Age	Hometown
Argentina	Agustina Rosso	21	Rosario
Bahamas	Tiasha Winnifred Lewis	17	Grand Bahama
Bolivia	Katherine Aysathu Añazgo Orozco	22	Tarija
Brazil	Francielly Soares Ouriques	24	São José
Canada	Camila González	19	Toronto
Chile	Nicolé Celeste Arancibia Huerque	24	Santiago
Colombia	María Camila Múnera Galeano	19	Pereira
Costa Rica	Génesis Karina Gaitán Sandino	19	Naranjo de Alajuela
Cuba	Liannys Sánchez Pedroso	22	Colón
Dominican Republic	Jearmanda Ramos Rosario	19	Puerto Plata
El Salvador	Génesis Margarita Fuentes Bolaños	22	San Miguel
Germany	Alexandra Waluk	22	Bad Segeberg
Guatemala	María José Larrañaga Retolaza	24	Guatemala City
Haiti	Bayard Danourah Bien-Aime	23	Port-au-Prince
Honduras	Kerelyne Isell Campigotti Webster	19	El Progreso
Italy	Sara Croce	18	Milan
Japan	Emiri Shimizu	25	Maebashi
Mexico	María de Lourdes «Marilú» Acevedo Domínguez	22	Veracruz
Nicaragua	América Monserrath Allen Rojas	18	Rivas
Paraguay	Alma María Monserrat Villagra Miranda	19	Pirayú
Peru	Melissa Gustavson Riboty	19	Lima
Poland	Magdalena Aneta Wesołowska	22	Sosnowiec
Portugal	Ana Catarina Pereira Moreira	22	Miragaia
Puerto Rico	Ciara Marie Rosendo Martínez	18	Manatí
Spain	Raquel Ruiz Revilla	22	Zaragoza
Uruguay	Wendy Lehmann Pignatta	19	Montevideo
United States	Claribel Marie Laureano de León	22	Savannah
Venezuela	Ana Cristina Díaz D´Santiago	25	Trujillo

== Crossovers ==
Contestants who previously competed or will compete at other beauty pageants:

Miss World:

- 2015: Guatemala – María José Larrañaga
- 2016: Honduras – Kerelyne Campigotti
- 2017: Nicaragua – Monserrath Allen

Miss International:

- 2016: Bolivia – Katherine Añazgo

Miss All Nations:

- 2016: Canada – Camila González

Reinado Mundial del Banano:

- 2015: Peru – Melissa Gustavson
- 2016: El Salvador – Génesis Fuentes

Miss United Continents:

- 2016: Japan – Emiri Shimizu

World Miss University:

- 2015: Portugal – Ana Catarina Pereira
