= Reina Hispanoamericana =

International beauty pageant

- Formation: 1991; 35 years ago
- Type: Beauty pageant
- Headquarters: Santa Cruz de la Sierra
- Location: Bolivia
- Official language: Spanish
- President: Gloria De Limpias
- Current titleholder: Kimberly de Boer, Curaçao
- Budget: CA$2 million
- Website: promocionesgloria.com/reina-hispanoamericana/

Reina Hispanoamericana (Hispanic American Queen) is an annual beauty pageant that celebrates Hispanic heritage, language, and culture. It was established in 1991 as Reina Sudamericana (South American Queen) and is headquartered in Santa Cruz de la Sierra, Bolivia.

Organized by Promociones Gloria, the pageant has expanded over the years and now features around 35 contestants from countries with Hispanic influence, reflecting its growing international reach. The pageant initially featured only South American participants but has since expanded to include contestants from Central America, the Caribbean, North America, Europe, Asia, and Oceania.

The pageant celebrates Hispanic heritage, language, and culture, with regular participation from countries like Mexico, Puerto Rico, the Philippines, and Spain. Recent additions, such as Indonesia (2023) and Guyana (2024), highlight its growing global reach.

The current titleholder, Reina Hispanoamericana 2026, is Kimberly de Boer from the Curaçao, who was crowned on 21 February 2026 in Santa Cruz, Bolivia.

== History ==
Reina Hispanoamericana, originally known as Reina Sudamericana (South American Queen), was established in 1991 and is headquartered in Santa Cruz de la Sierra, Bolivia. Initially, the competition was limited to contestants from the ten South American nations.

In 2004, the pageant expanded to include participants from Panama and Costa Rica in Central America. By 2006, it further welcomed contestants from the Dominican Republic, Nicaragua, Puerto Rico, Portugal, and Spain.

The year 2007 marked a significant milestone when the competition opened its doors to Mexico, Guatemala, Honduras, and the United States, prompting a name change to Reina Hispanoamericana to reflect its broader reach.

In 2008, Curaçao and Haiti joined the competition, followed by the Philippines, Canada, and Australia in 2017. Indonesia was invited as a special guest in 2023, and in 2024, the pageant further expanded its global presence by welcoming contestants from Guyana and Poland.

== Titleholders ==
Year	Reina Hispanoamericana	Virreina Hispanoamericana	1st Runner-Up	2nd Runner-Up	3rd Runner-Up	4th Runner-Up	5th Runner-Up	6th Runner-Up	7th Runner-Up	8th Runner-Up	9th Runner-Up
2026	Kimberly de Boer; Curaçao	Marta Isabel Otero; Colombia	Criselys Garcia; Dominican Republic	Melissa Payró; Mexico	Tiffany González; Puerto Rico	Camila Chacón; Peru	Emely Barile; Venezuela	Luz González; Nicaragua	Not awarded		
2025	Dia Maté; Philippines	Sofia Férnandez; Venezuela	Sharon Gamarra; Colombia	Carolina Barroso; Spain	Nikita Palma; Peru	Julia de Castro; Brazil	Zuzanna Balonek; Poland	Not awarded			
2023	Maricielo Gamarra; Peru	Fernanda Rojas; Venezuela	Cynthia Moura; Brazil	Michelle Arceo; Philippines	Bianty Gomperts; Curaçao	Paula Andrea Alarcón; Colombia	Not awarded				
2022	Arlette Rujel; Peru	Adriana Pérez; Venezuela	Guilhermina Montarroyos; Brazil	Ediris Rivera; Puerto Rico	Diana Robles; Mexico	María Lucía Cuesta; Colombia	Not awarded				
2021	Andrea Bazarte; Mexico	Ana Lucia Tejeira; Panama	Alejandra Vengoechea; Colombia	Andrea Romero; Venezuela	Emmanuelle Vera; Philippines	Bruna Zanardo; Brazil	Theresa Agonia; Portugal	Not awarded			
2019	Regina Peredo; Mexico	Gabrielle Vilela de Souza; Brazil	Laura Claro; Colombia	Yuanilie Alvarado; Puerto Rico	Ketlin Lottermann; Paraguay	Valeria Badell; Venezuela	Katrina Llegado; Philippines	Ainara Cardaño; Spain	Franchesca Astier; Dominican Republic	Cassandra Cherry; Haiti	Monserrat Báez; United States
2018	Nariman Battikha; Venezuela	Isabela Pandini; Brazil	Aranza Molina; Mexico	Belén Alderete Gayoso; Paraguay	Joyce Prado; Bolivia	Camila Ignacia Helfmann; Chile	Lisseth Naranjo; Ecuador	Gleidys Leyva; Cuba	Jessica McFarlane; Peru	Daniela Santeliz; Europe	Not awarded
2017	Teresita Ssen Marquez; Philippines	Akisha Albert; Curaçao	Maria Laís Wernner; Brazil	María Victoria D'Ambrosio; Venezuela	Karla María López; Mexico	Katherine Añazgo; Bolivia	Gladys Carredeguas; Cuba	Daisy Lezcano; Paraguay	Valentina Schnitzer; Chile	Lorena Larriviere; Peru	Not awarded
2016	Maria Camila Soleibe; Colombia	Magdalena Chiprés; Mexico	Mayra Alves; Brazil	Antonella Massaro; Venezuela	Raquel Pélissier; Haiti	Lourdes Melgarejo; Paraguay	Sarah Loinaz; Spain	Fiorella Peirano; Peru	Not awarded		
2015	Sofía del Prado; Spain	Laura Garcete (Dethroned); Paraguay	Digene Zimmerman (new Virreina); Aruba	Karielys Cuadros; Venezuela	Yoana Don; Argentina	Neyda Lithgow; Curaçao	Not awarded				
2014	Romina Rocamonje; Bolivia	Vanessa López Quijada; Mexico	Andrea Lira; Venezuela	Inés Carolina Panchano; Ecuador	Carolyn Désert; Haiti	María de Lourdes Gallimore Campos; Panama	Cindy Clavijo; Colombia	Raquel De Oliveira; Brazil	Laura Mejia; Curaçao	Not awarded	
2013	María Alejandra López; Colombia	Yaritza Reyes; Dominican Republic	Gabriela Graf; Venezuela	María José Barrena; Chile	Gabriela Prieto; Mexico	Suzette Rivera; Puerto Rico	María Guadalupe González; Paraguay	Claudia María Tavel; Bolivia	Not awarded		
2012	Sarodj Bertin; Haiti	Juliana Sampaio; Spain	Alexia Laura Viruez; Bolivia	Stephania Stegman; Paraguay	Jeanine de Castro; Brazil	Ana Lorena Ibáñez; Panama	Damaris Aguiar; Cuba	Not awarded			
2011	Evalina Van Putten; Curaçao	María Jesús Matthei; Chile	Yessica Sharit Mouton; Bolivia	Olga Álava; Ecuador	Alba Lucia Riquelme; Paraguay	Alba Fortes Viñolas; Spain	Angela Ruiz; Venezuela	Not awarded			
2010	Caroline Medina; Venezuela	Egni Eckert; Paraguay	Maria Olivia Pinheiro; Bolivia	Suymara Barreto; Brazil	Raquel Lozano; Spain	Stephany Ortega; Uruguay	Yesica Di Vincenzó; Argentina	Not awarded			
2009	Adriana Vasini; Venezuela	Sandra Vinces; Ecuador	Livia da Silva; Brazil	Melodia Jiménez; Spain	Flavia Foianini; Bolivia	Rocio Castellanos; Dominican Republic	Lina Marcela Mosquera; Colombia	Not awarded			
2008	Laura Zúñiga (Dethroned); Mexico	Vivian Noronha (Successor); Brazil	Gabriela Rejala (new Virreina); Paraguay	Paula Andrea Díaz; Uruguay	Noemí Peltier; Bolivia	Ligia Elena Hernández; Venezuela	Annmarie Dehainaut; Peru	Not awarded			
2007	Massiel Taveras; Dominican Republic	Jane De Sousa; Brazil	Maria José Maldonado; Paraguay	Maria Jesús Ruiz; Spain	Not awarded						
2006	Francine Eickemberg; Brazil	Ana María Ortíz; Bolivia	Lourdes Arévalos; Paraguay	Not awarded							
2005	Diana Milena Cepeda; Colombia	Priscila Del Salto; Ecuador	Jictzad Viña; Venezuela	María Fiorella Castellano; Peru	Emilce Rosanna Gómez; Paraguay	Not awarded					
2004	Tania Domanickzy; Paraguay	Mónica Jaramillo; Colombia	Maria Nuvia Montenegro; Bolivia	Catarina Guerra; Brazil	Lucia Alva Espinoza; Peru	Not awarded					
2003	Cecília Valarini; Brazil	María Fernanda Tóndolo; Venezuela	Karina Rebeca Naumann; Paraguay	Aldana Joyce García; Peru	Not awarded						
2002	Marcela Ruete; Ecuador	Irene Aguilera; Bolivia	María Claudia Pañuela; Colombia	Giselle de Oliveira; Brazil	Not awarded						
2001	María Rocío; Colombia	Norelys Rodríguez; Venezuela	Katja Thomsen; Uruguay	Julia Rodríguez; Ecuador	Paola Coimbra; Bolivia	Not awarded					
2000	Ligia Petit; Venezuela	Natalia Figueras; Uruguay	Lissette Ocayo; Chile	Claudia Araño; Bolivia	Not awarded						
1999	Jenny Vaca Paz; Bolivia	Karen Larrea; Brazil	María Laura Lugo; Venezuela	Claudie Neyra; Peru	Not awarded						
1998	Susana Barrientos; Bolivia	Daira Lambis; Venezuela	Paola Villarroel; Chile Marcela Viviana Brane; Argentina	Not awarded							
1997	Patricia Fuenmayor; Venezuela	Verónica Larrieu; Bolivia	Geraldine Olga Salmón; Peru	Not awarded							
1996	Helga Bauer (Dethroned); Bolivia	Gabriela Vergara (Successor); Venezuela	Tonka Tomicic (new Virreina); Chile	Paula Denise Simon; Brazil	Not awarded						
1995	Carolina Taís Müller; Brazil	María Auxiliadora González; Venezuela	Paola Cristina Torres; Colombia	Patricia Serafini; Paraguay	Not awarded						
1994	Liliana González; Paraguay	Solange Pastor; Venezuela	Carla Romero; Bolivia	Not awarded							
1993	Paola Vintimilla; Ecuador	Savka Pollak; Chile	Alicia Ramon; Argentina	Not awarded							
1992	Francis Gago; Venezuela	Raquel Chaparro; Colombia	Karen Goudeau; Brazil	Not awarded							
1991	Patricia Godói; Brazil	Vivian Benítez; Paraguay	Niurka Acevedo; Venezuela	Not awarded							

== Countries by number of wins ==
Country/Territory	Titles	Winning Year(s)
Venezuela	7	1992, 1996*, 1997, 2000, 2009, 2010, 2018
Brazil	5	1991, 1995, 2003, 2006, 2008
Colombia	4	2001, 2005, 2013, 2016
Bolivia	3	1996*, 1998, 1999, 2014
Mexico	3	2008, 2019, 2021
Curaçao	2	2011, 2026
Philippines	2	2017, 2025
Peru	2	2022, 2023
Paraguay	2	1994, 2004
Ecuador	2	1993, 2002
Spain	1	2015
Haiti	1	2012
Dominican Republic	1	2007
