= Miss Universe 2009 =

58th edition of the Miss Universe competition

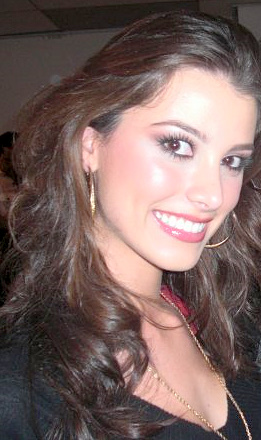
- Stefanía Fernández
- Date: August 23, 2009
- Presenters: Billy Bush; Claudia Jordan
- Entertainment: Heidi Montag; Flo Rida; Kelly Rowland; David Guetta
- Venue: Imperial Ballroom, Atlantis Paradise Island, Nassau, The Bahamas
- Broadcaster: NBC/Telemundo (international); ZNS-TV (official broadcaster)
- Entrants: 83
- Placements: 15
- Withdrawals: Antigua and Barbuda; Denmark; Kazakhstan; Sri Lanka; Trinidad and Tobago; Turks and Caicos Islands
- Returns: Bulgaria; Ethiopia; Guyana; Iceland; Lebanon; Namibia; Romania; Sweden; Zambia
- Winner: Stefanía Fernández; Venezuela
- Congeniality: Wang Jingyao, China
- Best National Costume: Diana Broce, Panama
- Photogenic: Chutima Durongdej, Thailand

Miss Universe 2009 was the 58th Miss Universe pageant, held at the Imperial Ballroom in Atlantis Paradise Island, Nassau, the Bahamas, on August 23, 2009.

At the end of the event, Dayana Mendoza of Venezuela crowned Stefanía Fernández of Venezuela as Miss Universe 2009. This marks the first time in Miss Universe history that a country has won twice consecutively.

Contestants from 83 countries and territories competed in this year's pageant. The competition was hosted by Billy Bush and Claudia Jordan; Bush last served as host during Miss Universe 2005. Heidi Montag, Flo Rida, Kelly Rowland, and David Guetta performed in this year's pageant.

The competition also featured the debut of the new Diamond Nexus Crown. For the first time ever, fans are able to vote between three designs for the new crown. The fans voted for the Peace crown, which is set with 1,371 gemstones, weighing a total of 416.09 carats or 83.218 g. It is made with an alloy that contains 544.31 grams of 14k and 18k white gold as well as platinum. The crown also featured synthetic rubies to represent the main advocacy of Miss Universe which is HIV/AIDS education and awareness. It is considered to be an eco-friendly crown due to its synthetic stone materials.

== Background ==
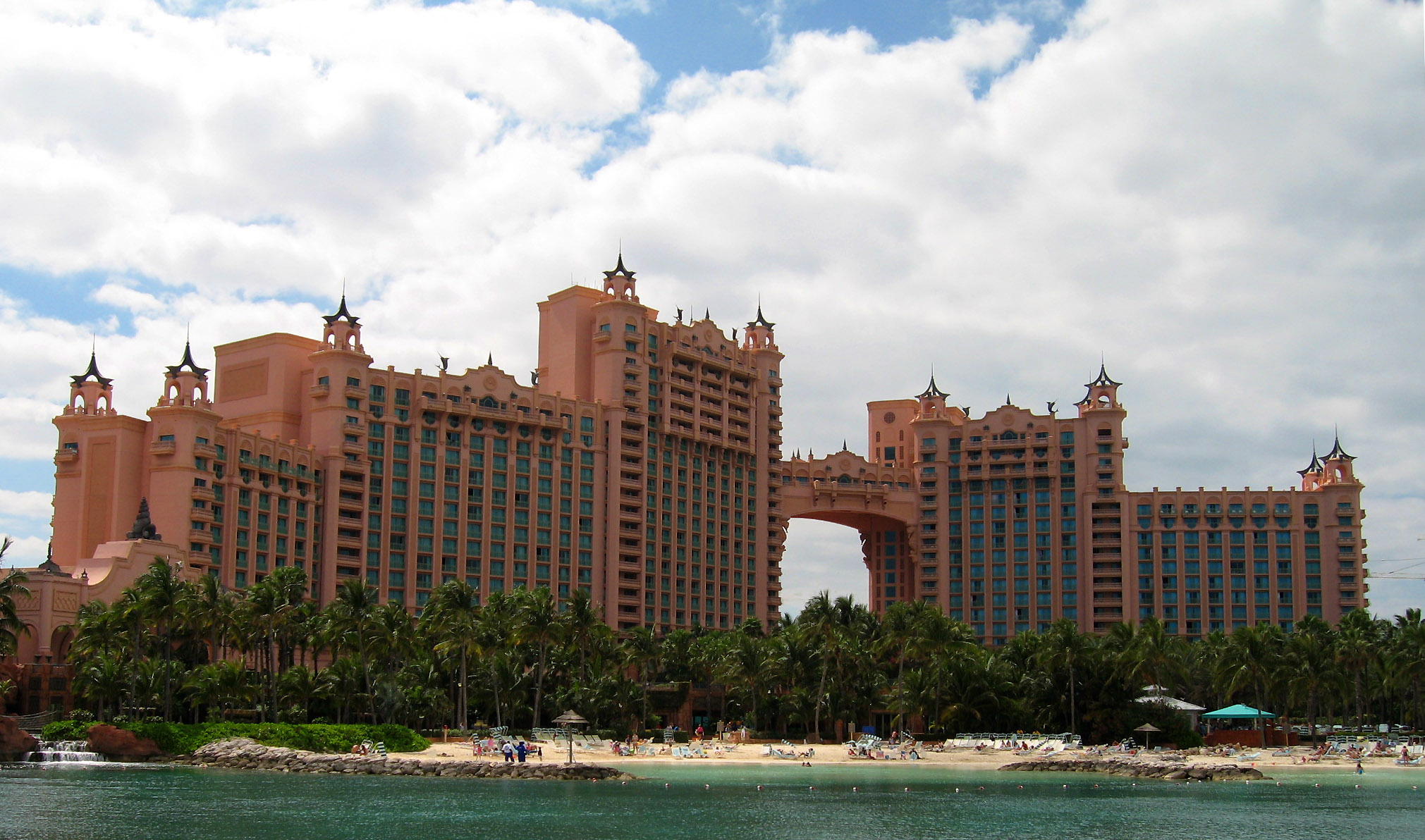
Atlantis Paradise Island Hotel, the venue of Miss Universe 2009

=== Location and date ===
Donald Trump, president of the Miss Universe Organization, had intentions on holding the 2009 pageant in Dubai. However, the negotiations did not materialize due to the political instability regarding relations between the United Arab Emirates and Israel and also for religious reasons. Croatia was also interested in hosting the 2009 pageant. However, the country withdrew its bid to host the contest due to economic problems related to the current global economic crisis.

On July 1, 2008, investor Jonathan Westbrook tried launched a bid for Australia to host the 2009 edition of the pageant. However, his efforts were in vain as the possible venues were not interested. Eventually, on March 3, 2009, the Miss Universe Organization announced that the competition would be at the Atlantis Paradise Island in Nassau, The Bahamas. The pageant would initially take place on August 25, however, the contest was moved to August 23, 2009.

=== Selection of participants ===
Contestants from eighty-three countries and territories were selected to compete in the competition. Four of these delegates were appointees to their positions after being a runner-up of their national pageant or being selected through a casting process, while another was selected to replace the original dethroned winner.

Angenie Simon, the first runner-up of Miss Curaçao 2009, was appointed to represent Curaçao after Ashanta Macauly, Miss Curaçao 2009, withdrew due to unknown health problems. Bélgica Suárez, the runner-up of Miss Honduras 2008, was appointed to represent Honduras at Miss Universe due to the political crisis in Honduras. Võ Hoàng Yến, the first runner-up of Miss Universe Vietnam 2008, was appointed as Miss Universe Vietnam 2009 by UNICorp, the franchise holder of Miss Universe in Vietnam.

The 2009 edition saw the returns of Bulgaria, Ethiopia, Guyana, Iceland, Lebanon, Namibia, Romania, Sweden, and Zambia. Romania last competed in 1998, Ethiopia, Iceland, Namibia, and Sweden last competed in 2006, while the others last competed in 2007. Antigua and Barbuda, Denmark, Kazakhstan, Sri Lanka, Trinidad and Tobago, and Turks and Caicos withdrew. Olga Nikitina of Kazakhstan withdrew due to lack of sponsorship, while Faith Landers of Sri Lanka withdrew due to undisclosed reasons. Jewel Selver of Turks and Caicos withdrew from the competition 24 hours before the final due to dehydration. However, Selver was still included at the parade of nations at the beginning of the final telecast. Antigua and Barbuda, Denmark, and Trinidad and Tobago withdrew after their respective organizations failed to hold a national competition or appoint a delegate.

Diana Niles of Luxembourg was set to compete at Miss Universe. However, Niles withdrew for undisclosed reasons.

Sorene Maratita of the Northern Mariana Islands was also set to compete at Miss Universe. However, Maratita withdrew due to lack of sponsorship and funding.

=== Incidents before the pageant ===
On August 1, 2009 Bolivian officials stated that it could present a legal challenge to the organizers of Miss Universe due to the planned use of a typical Diablada costume by the Peruvian candidate Karen Schwarz. Pablo Groux, Bolivian minister of Culture, said that any use of the costume by Schwarz in the contest would be an unlawful appropriation of Bolivian heritage and threatened to bring the case to the International Court of Justice. El Comercio, a Peruvian newspaper, mentioned that this is not the first time the diablada costume is shown in the contest and that it was María Josefa Isensee, a Chilean, that first used it in the Miss Universe contest. The Peruvian foreign minister José Antonio García Belaúnde said that since the diablada dress is of indigenous Aymara origin it can not be considered exclusive of any of the countries where Aymaras lives.

== Results ==
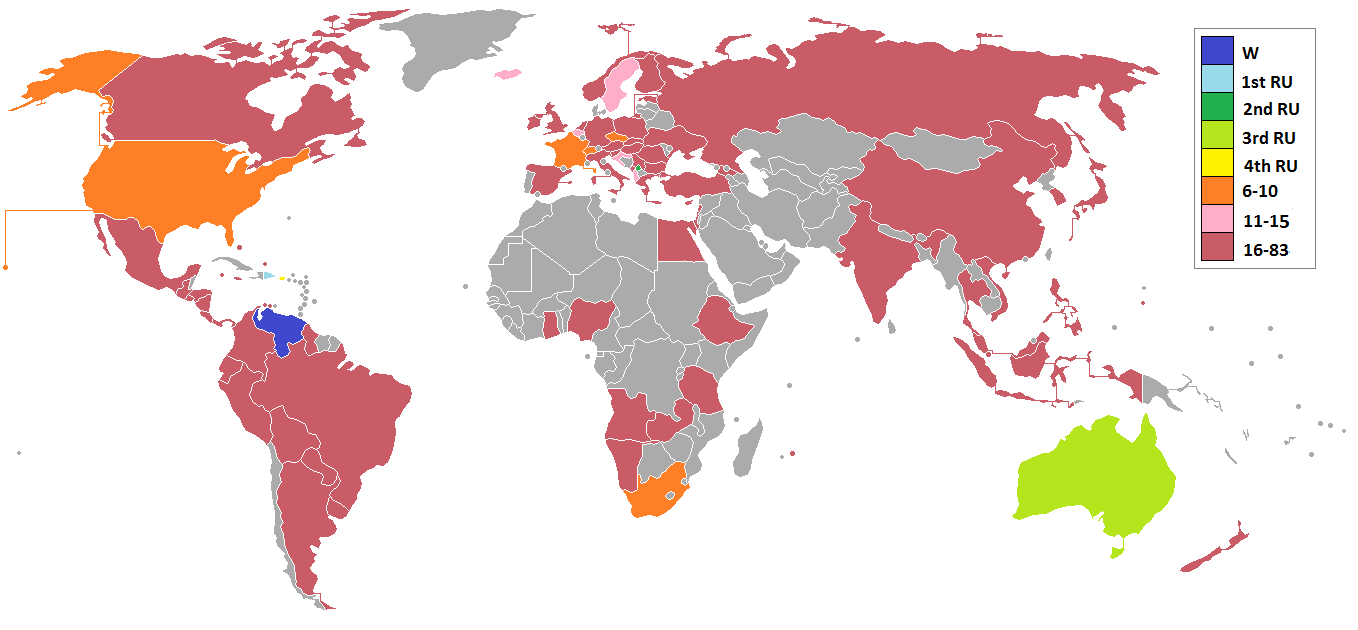
Miss Universe 2009 participating countries and territories.

=== Placements ===
| Placement | Contestant |
|---|---|
| Miss Universe 2009 | Venezuela – Stefanía Fernández |
| 1st Runner-Up | Dominican Republic – Ada de la Cruz |
| 2nd Runner-Up | Kosovo – Marigona Dragusha |
| 3rd Runner-Up | Australia – Rachael Finch |
| 4th Runner-Up | Puerto Rico – Mayra Matos |
| Top 10 | Czech Republic – Iveta Lutovská; France – Chloé Mortaud; South Africa – Tatum Keshwar; Switzerland – Whitney Toyloy; United States – Kristen Dalton |
| Top 15 | Albania – Hasna Xhukiçi; Belgium – Zeynep Sever; Croatia – Sarah Ćosić; Iceland – Ingibjörg Egilsdóttir; Sweden – Renate Cerljen |

==== Final scores ====
| Winner |
| 1st Runner-up |
| 2nd Runner-up |
| 3rd Runner-up |
| 4th Runner-up |
| Top 10 |
| Top 15 |

| Country/Territory | Swimsuit | Evening Gown |
|---|---|---|
| Venezuela | 8.760 (4) | 8.869 (5) |
| Dominican Republic | 9.189 (2) | 9.428 (1) |
| Kosovo | 8.790 (3) | 9.250 (2) |
| Australia | 9.264 (1) | 9.039 (4) |
| Puerto Rico | 8.533 (7) | 9.050 (3) |
| France | 8.640 (5) | 8.650 (6) |
| South Africa | 8.460 (8) | 8.040 (7) |
| Czech Republic | 8.350 (9) | 8.010 (8) |
| Switzerland | 8.611 (6) | 7.890 (9) |
| United States | 8.060 (10) | 7.550 (10) |
| Albania | 7.900 (11) | |
| Belgium | 7.870 (12) | |
| Sweden | 7.830 (13) | |
| Croatia | 7.811 (14) | |
| Iceland | 7.730 (15) | |

=== Special awards ===
| Award | Contestant |
|---|---|
| Miss Congeniality | China – Wang Jingyao |
| Miss Photogenic | Thailand – Chutima Durongdej |

==== Best National Costume ====
| Final results | Contestant |
|---|---|
| Winner | Panama – Diana Broce |
| 2nd Place | Nicaragua – Indiana Sánchez |
| 3rd Place | Thailand – Chutima Durongdej |

== Pageant ==
=== Format ===
Same with 2007, fifteen semi-finalists were chosen through the preliminary competition— composed of the swimsuit and evening gown competitions and closed-door interviews. The fifteen semi-finalists competed in the swimsuit competition and were narrowed down to ten afterward. The ten semi-finalists competed in the evening gown competition and were narrowed down to five afterward. The five finalists competed in the question and answer round and the final look.

=== Selection committee ===
==== Preliminary competition ====
- Mark Wylie – Best Buddies Talent Executive
- Adriana Ching – Licensed attorney and a former real estate developer avid philanthropist
- Todd Winston – Veteran of the hospitality industry and Vice President of Sales at Creative Promotional
- Rosalina Lydster – Fashion designer for celebrities
- Tiza Tjokroadisumarto – Director of Retail Operations for Michael Kors
- Corinne Nicolas – President of Trump Model Management
- David Friedman – Last Call with Carson Daly Executive Producer
- Steven Schillaci – Talent Producer for many hit shows including American Idol
- Mario Mosley – Hollywood Choreographer of Oxygen's Dance Your Ass Off
- Sarah Markantonis – Ambassador of Kerzner International Bahamas

==== Final telecast ====
- Dean Cain – Actor and producer
- Tamara Tunie – Actress, "Law & Order: Special Victims Unit"
- Colin Cowie – Author, Television Personality and Designer to the Stars
- Valeria Mazza – International Supermodel
- Matthew Rolston – Leading Photographer and director
- Richard LeFrak – Chairperson, President and CEO LeFrak Organization
- André Leon Talley – Award-winning Writer and editor
- Heather Kerzner – Philanthropist and Ambassador for Kerzner International and Resorts
- Farouk Shami – Founder and Chairman of CHI Hair Care
- Keisha Whitaker – Fashion Maven and Founder of the Kissable Couture Lip Gloss line
- Gerry DeVeaux – Award-winning Producer, Songwriter and Style Guru
- George J. Maloof, Jr. – Professional Sports Mogul and Hotelier

== Contestants ==
Eighty-three contestants competed for the title.

| Country/Territory | Contestant | Age (Note: Ages at the time of pageant.) | Hometown |
|---|---|---|---|
| Albania | Hasna Xhukiçi | 21 | Fier |
| Angola | Nelsa Alves | 22 | Luanda |
| Argentina | Johanna Lasic | 23 | Buenos Aires |
| Aruba | Dianne Croes | 22 | Oranjestad |
| Australia | Rachael Finch | 21 | Townsville |
| Bahamas | Kiara Sherman | 26 | Freeport |
| Belgium | Zeynep Sever | 20 | Brussels |
| Bolivia | Dominique Peltier | 22 | Cochabamba |
| Brazil | Larissa Costa | 25 | São Gonçalo Do Amarante |
| Bulgaria | Elitsa Lubenova | 19 | Dve Mogili |
| Canada | Mariana Valente | 23 | Richmond Hill |
| Cayman Islands | Nicosia Lawson | 26 | George Town |
| China | Wang Jingyao | 18 | Qingdao |
| Colombia | Michelle Rouillard | 22 | Popayán |
| Costa Rica | Jessica Umaña | 21 | Moravia |
| Croatia | Sarah Ćosić | 20 | Split |
| Curaçao | Angenie Simon | 24 | Willemstad |
| Cyprus | Kielia Giasemidou | 20 | Nicosia |
| Czech Republic | Iveta Lutovská | 26 | Třeboň |
| Dominican Republic | Ada de la Cruz | 23 | Villa Mella |
| Ecuador | Sandra Vinces | 19 | Portoviejo |
| Egypt | Elham Wagdy | 26 | Cairo |
| El Salvador | Mayella Mena | 21 | San Salvador |
| Estonia | Diana Arno | 25 | Tallinn |
| Ethiopia | Melat Yante | 19 | Addis Ababa |
| Finland | Essi Pöysti | 22 | Jyväskylä |
| France | Chloé Mortaud | 19 | Bénac |
| Georgia | Lika Ordzhonikidze | 19 | Tbilisi |
| Germany | Martina Lee | 24 | Meinerzhagen |
| Ghana | Jennifer Koranteng | 23 | Accra |
| Great Britain (Note: UK changed the name of their sash to Great Britain which was last used in 2000.) | Clair Cooper | 27 | London |
| Greece | Viviana Zagorianakou Campanile | 19 | Athens |
| Guam | Racine Manley | 24 | Dededo |
| Guatemala | Lourdes Figueroa | 21 | Guatemala City |
| Guyana | Jenel Cox | 19 | Georgetown |
| Honduras | Bélgica Suárez | 23 | Tegucigalpa |
| Hungary | Suzann Budai | 21 | Budapest |
| Iceland | Ingibjörg Egilsdóttir | 24 | Eastern Region |
| India | Ekta Chowdhry | 23 | New Delhi |
| Indonesia | Zivanna Letisha Siregar | 20 | Jakarta |
| Ireland | Diana Donnelly | 20 | Dublin |
| Israel | Julia Dyment | 20 | Haifa |
| Italy | Laura Valenti | 25 | Arezzo |
| Jamaica | Carolyn Yapp | 25 | Montego Bay |
| Japan | Emiri Miyasaka | 25 | Tokyo |
| Kosovo | Marigona Dragusha | 18 | Pristina |
| Lebanon | Martine Andraos | 19 | Byblos |
| Malaysia | Joannabelle Ng | 21 | Kota Kinabalu |
| Mauritius | Anaïs Veerapatren | 23 | Curepipe |
| Mexico | Karla Carrillo | 21 | Guadalajara |
| Montenegro | Anja Jovanović | 20 | Podgorica |
| Namibia | Happie Ntelamo | 20 | Katima Mulilo |
| Netherlands | Avalon-Chanel Weyzig | 19 | Zwolle |
| New Zealand | Katie Taylor | 22 | Auckland |
| Nicaragua | Indiana Sánchez | 22 | Managua |
| Nigeria | Sandra Otohwo | 20 | Asaba |
| Norway | Eli Landa | 25 | Stavanger |
| Panama | Diana Broce | 23 | Las Tablas |
| Paraguay | Mareike Baumgarten | 19 | Asunción |
| Peru | Karen Schwarz | 25 | Lima |
| Philippines | Bianca Manalo | 21 | Manila |
| Poland | Angelika Jakubowska | 20 | Lubań |
| Puerto Rico | Mayra Matos | 20 | Cabo Rojo |
| Romania | Elena Bianca Constantin | 20 | Piatra-Neamt |
| Russia | Sofia Rudieva | 18 | Saint Petersburg |
| Serbia | Dragana Atlija | 22 | Belgrade |
| Singapore | Rachel Kum | 24 | Singapore |
| Slovakia | Denisa Mendrejová | 23 | Bratislava |
| Slovenia | Mirela Korač | 22 | Ljubljana |
| South Africa | Tatum Keshwar | 25 | Durban |
| South Korea | Na Ry | 23 | Seoul |
| Spain | Estíbaliz Pereira | 23 | Santiago de Compostela |
| Sweden | Renate Cerljen | 21 | Staffanstorp |
| Switzerland | Whitney Toyloy | 19 | Yverdon |
| Tanzania | Illuminata James | 24 | Mwanza |
| Thailand | Chutima Durongdej | 23 | Bangkok |
| Turkey | Senem Kuyucuoğlu | 18 | İzmir |
| Ukraine | Khrystyna Kots-Hotlib | 26 | Donetsk |
| United States | Kristen Dalton | 22 | Wilmington |
| Uruguay | Cintia D'ottone | 21 | Montevideo |
| Venezuela | Stefanía Fernández | 18 | Mérida |
| Vietnam | Võ Hoàng Yến | 21 | Ho Chi Minh City |
| Zambia | Andella Chileshe Matthews | 21 | Ndola |
