= Miss Malta Universe =

National beauty pageant competition in Malta

Miss Universe Malta Organization
- Formation: 2016; 10 years ago
- Purpose: Beauty pageant
- Headquarters: Valletta
- Location: Malta
- Official language: Maltese; English
- President / CEO: Alan J. Darmanin
- Affiliations: Miss Universe

Miss Universe Malta is a Maltese beauty pageant that selects the country representative for Miss Universe. The titleholder for 2024 is Beatrice Njoya of St. Paul's Bay who represented Malta at Miss Universe 2024, to be held in Mexico.

== History ==
Miss Malta was held for the first time in 1963, and called Miss Malta beauty pageant or Star of Malta. Maltese representatives for Miss Universe were selected by this pageant until 2001.

== Council formats ==
At Miss Universe Malta, candidates wear sashes representing their local councils. A candidate may represent the same council more than once, depending on Miss Universe Malta’s requirements. Although Malta has 68 official councils, not all participate each year, as it depends on the number of qualified candidates. The final results include a second runner-up, a first runner-up, and the winner.

- Miss Attard
- Miss Balzan
- Miss Birgu
- Miss Birkirkara
- Miss Birżebbuġa
- Miss Cospicua
- Miss Dingli
- Miss Fgura
- Miss Floriana
- Miss Fontana
- Miss Għajnsielem
- Miss Għarb
- Miss Għargħur
- Miss Għasri
- Miss Għaxaq
- Miss Gudja
- Miss Gzira
- Miss Ħamrun
- Miss Iklin
- Miss Kalkara
- Miss Kercem
- Miss Kirkop
- Miss Lija
- Miss Luqa
- Miss Marsa
- Miss Marsaskala
- Miss Marsaxlokk
- Miss Mdina
- Miss Mellieħa
- Miss Mgarr
- Miss Mosta
- Miss Mqabba
- Miss Msida
- Miss Mtarfa
- Miss Munxar
- Miss Nadur
- Miss Naxxar
- Miss Paola
- Miss Pambroke
- Miss Pieta
- Miss Qala
- Miss Qormi
- Miss Qrendi
- Miss Rabat
- Miss Safi
- Miss Saint Julian's
- Miss Saint Paul's Bay
- Miss San Gwann
- Miss San Lawrenz
- Miss Sannat
- Miss Santa Luċija
- Miss Santa Venera
- Miss Senglea
- Miss Siġġiewi
- Miss Sliema
- Miss Swieqi
- Miss Tarxien
- Miss Valletta
- Miss Vitoria
- Miss Ta' Xbiex
- Miss Xagħra
- Miss Xewkija
- Miss Xgħajra
- Miss Zabbar
- Miss Zebbug (Citta Rohan)
- Miss Zebbug
- Miss Zejtun
- Miss Zurrieq

== National franchise holders ==
- George and Deggie Gatt Mangion (1968―2001)
- Alan J. Darmanin (2016―Present)

== Titleholders ==
Year	Miss Universe Malta	Local Council	First Runner-up	Local Council	Second Runner-up	Local Council
2016	Martha Fenech	St. Julian's	Christine Mifsud	Fgura	Dajana Laketic	Swatar
2017	Tiffany Pisani	Attard	Caricia Sammut	Rabat	Alexia Pauline Tabone	Tarxien
2018	Francesca Mifsud	Żejtun	Lyann Llies	Qawra	Marilena Gauci	Mellieħa
2019	Teresa Ruglio	Sliema	Nicola Grixti	Gżira	Nicole Mallia	Naxxar
2020	Anthea Zammit	Żebbuġ	Madeline Baldacchino	Qrendi	Jasmine Camilleri	Mosta
2021	Jade Cini	Valletta	Michela Galea	Mġarr	Maxine Formosa	St. Julian's
2022	Maxine Formosa	St. Julian's	Not awarded			
2023	Ella Portelli	St. Julian's	Julia Cluett	Floriana	Ntombi Malinga	San Gwann
2024	Beatrice Njoya	Saint Paul's Bay	Janei Desira	Zejtun	Julieth Vasco	Floriana
2025	Julia Cluett	Floriana	TBA	Mosta	TBA	Santa Lucia
2026	Francesca Mercieca	St. Paul's Bay	TBA	TBA	TBA	TBA

== International pageants ==
=== Miss Universe Malta 2016—present ===
- : Declared as Winner
- : Ended as runner-up or top 5/6 qualification
- : Ended as one of the finalists or semifinalists
- : Ended as special awards winner

Year	Local Council	Miss Universe Malta	Placement at Miss Universe	Special awards	Notes
Alan J. Darmanin directorship — a franchise holder to Miss Universe from 2016
2026	Saint Paul's Bay	Francesca Mercieca	TBA		
2025	Floriana	Julia Cluett	Top 12	Miss Universe Europe and Middle East	First ever placement of Malta in Miss Universe history.
2024	Saint Paul's Bay	Beatrice Njoya	Unplaced		First married woman to win the title of Miss Universe Malta.
2023	St. Julian's	Ella Portelli	Unplaced		
2022	St. Julian's	Maxine Formosa	Unplaced	Miss Congeniality	Appointed — The 2nd Runner-up of 2021 crowned as the Miss Universe Malta 2022.
2021	Valletta	Jade Cini	Unplaced		
2020	Żebbuġ	Anthea Zammit	Unplaced		
2019	Sliema	Teresa Ruglio	Unplaced		The 1st Venezuelan-Maltese in Miss Malta history.
2018	Żejtun	Francesca Mifsud	Unplaced		
2017	Attard	Tiffany Pisani	Unplaced		The winner of the cycle 6 of Britain's Next Top Model 2010.
2016	St. Julian's	Martha Fenech	Unplaced		
Did not compete between 2002-2015

=== Star of Malta / Miss Malta 1968—2001 ===
- : Declared as Winner
- : Ended as runner-up or top 5/6 qualification
- : Ended as one of the finalists or semifinalists
- : Ended as special awards winner

Below is Miss Malta who was sent the winners to Miss Universe between 1968 and 2001.

Year	Local Council	Miss Malta	Placement at Miss Universe	Special awards	Notes
George and Deggie Gatt Mangion directorship — a franchise holder to Miss Universe between 1968―2001
2001	Città Victoria	Rosalie Theuma	Unplaced		
2000	St. Lucia	Jolene Arpa	Unplaced		
1999	Qormi	Dorianne Muscat	Unplaced		
1998	Valletta	Carol Cassar	Unplaced		
1997	San Ġwann	Claire Grech	Unplaced		
1996	Lija	Roseanne Farrugia	Unplaced		
1995	Fleur-de-Lys	Sonia Massa	Unplaced		Miss Malta returned wearing the sash of Malta.
George and Deggie Gatt Mangion directorship "Miss Republic of Malta"
1994	Fleur-de-Lys	Paola Camilleri	Unplaced		
1993	Qormi	Roberta Borg	Unplaced		
1992	Città Victoria	Julienne Camilleri	Unplaced		
1991	Qormi	Michelle Zarb	Unplaced		
1990	Msida	Charmaine Farrugia	Unplaced		
1989	Città Victoria	Sylvana Sammut Pandolfino	Unplaced		Miss Malta wore the Republic of Malta name on her sash.
George and Deggie Gatt Mangion directorship "Star Malta/Miss Malta"
1988	Santa Venera	Stephanie Spiteri	Unplaced		
1987	Mdina	Kristina Apap Bologna	Unplaced		
1986	Mosta	Antoinette Zerafa	Unplaced		
1985	Pembroke	Fiona Micallef	Unplaced		
1984	Sliema	Marisa Sammut	Unplaced		
1983	Sliema	Christine Bonnici	Unplaced		
1982	Gzira	Rita Falzon	Unplaced		
1981	St Julian's	Susanne Galea	Unplaced		
1980	Valletta	Isabelle Zammit	Unplaced		
1979	Città Victoria	Dian Borg Bartolo	Unplaced		
1978	Żebbuġ	Pauline Lewise Farrugia	Unplaced		
1977	Żurrieq	Jane Benedicta Saliba	Unplaced		
1976	Kalkara	Mary Grace Ciantar	Unplaced		
1975	Valletta	Frances Pace Ciantar	Unplaced		
1974	Valletta	Josette Pace	Unplaced		
1973	Msida	Marthese Vigar	Unplaced		
1972	Paola	Doris Abdilla	Unplaced		
1971	Valletta	Felicity Celia Carbott	Unplaced		
1970	Birkirkara	Tessie Pisani	Unplaced		
1969	Gżira	Natalie Quintana	Unplaced		
1968	Qormi	Kathlene Farrugia	Unplaced		
