= Jenelli Fraser =

Belizean beauty pageant titleholder

- Born: July 7, 1991 (age 35); Belize City, Belize
- Education: University of Belize
- Beauty pageant titleholder
- Title: Miss Universe Belize 2018
- Hair color: Black
- Eye color: Dark Brown
- Major competitions: Miss Universe Belize 2018 (Winner); Miss Universe 2018 (Unplaced)

Jenelli Fraser (born July 7, 1991) is a Belizean beauty pageant titleholder who was crowned Miss Universe Belize 2018. As Miss Universe Belize, she represented Belize at Miss Universe 2018.

== Pageantry ==
In the months leading up to the pageant, Fraser said that it was "very difficult" to enter the pageant, due to financial issues. In an interview with LOVE FM, she said:

"...I had to change how my perception to things as well as I had to be health conscious and that means I had to exercise, eat healthy..."

=== Miss Universe Belize 2018 ===
On August 25, 2018, Fraser was crowned Miss Universe Belize 2018 by outgoing titleholder Rebecca Rath.

Awards and achievements
Preceded by Rebecca Rath	Miss Universe Belize; 2018	Succeeded by Destinee Arnold
