= Face of Sierra Leone =

National beauty pageant competition in Sierra Leone

IAMSL Organization
- Formation: 2012; 14 years ago
- Type: Beauty pageant
- Headquarters: Freetown
- Location: Sierra Leone
- Members: Miss Universe; Miss International; Miss Earth; Mister Supranational; Mister World
- Official language: English
- President: Swadu Natasha Beckley
- Website: iamsl.org

Face of Sierra Leone or also known as Miss Universe Sierra Leone, is a national Beauty pageant in Sierra Leone that selects the winner to represent the country in the Miss Universe, one of the Big Four international beauty pageants. The pageant was established in 2016 and the foundation held in 2012 and is considered the biggest pageant in Sierra Leone.

== History ==
The foundation of IAMSL was debuted in 2012 and launched a pageant to International competitions in 2016 by Swadu Natasha Beckley (former Miss Sierra Leone 2011). In 2018 the Face of Sierra Leone divided onto two national competitions which select the winner to Miss Universe and Miss Earth independently.

=== Purposes ===
The main purpose of the organization of Miss Universe Sierra Leone is to promote local tourism and to expose young Sierra Leonean women to different cultures and nationalities.

== Titleholders ==
The following is a list of all I Am Sierra Leone Pageant editions since 2016. In 2018 the name renamed as the Face of Sierra Leone.

Year	Miss Universe Sierra Leone	District	Mister Sierra Leone	District
2016	Hawa Kamara	Western Area Urban	Debuted 2017	x
2017	Adama Lakoh Kargbo	Bombali	Ibrahim Mansaray	Bombali
2018	Marie Esther Bangura	Port Loko	Mohamed Kamanoh	Western Area Urban
2021	x	x	Alhaji Hassan Mansaray	Koinadugu
2022	x	x	Uthman Issa Bangura	Western Area Urban

== Titleholders under The Face of Sierra Leone org. ==
=== Miss Universe Sierra Leone ===
- : Declared as Winner
- : Ended as runner-up or top 5/6 qualification
- : Ended as one of the finalists or semifinalists
- : Ended as special awards winner

Year	District	Miss Universe Sierra Leone	Placement at Miss Universe	Special Award(s)	Notes
2026	Bonthe	Katti Fofanah	TBA		
Did not compete since 2020—2025
Swadu Natasha Beckley directorship — a franchise holder to Miss Universe between 2016—2019
2019	Port Loko	Marie Esther Bangura	Unplaced		Marie was about to participate in the Miss Universe 2018 pageant; Unfortunately, she did not arrived in Thailand on time, this is due to her nation's condition of devastated by war; However, she attended the contest as a member of audience then MUO also allowed her to compete for the 68th edition instead.
2018	Did not compete				
2017	Bombali	Adama Lakoh Kargbo	Did not compete		Withdrawal — Visa Problem to upcoming Miss Universe 2017 in the United States.
2016	Western Area Urban	Hawa Kamara	Unplaced	Best National Costume (Top 12)	

=== Miss International Sierra Leone ===
- : Declared as Winner
- : Ended as runner-up or top 5/6 qualification
- : Ended as one of the finalists or semifinalists
- : Ended as special awards winner

Year	District	Miss International Sierra Leone	Placement at Miss International	Special Award(s)	Notes
Swadu Natasha Beckley directorship — a franchise holder to Miss International from 2016
Did not compete since 2025—Present
2024	Western Area Urban	Yalissa Kargbo	Unplaced		
2023	Did not compete				
2022	Western Area Urban	Fatu Rugiatu Kamara	Did not compete		
Due to the impact of COVID-19 pandemic, no pageant between 2020—2021
2019	Did not compete				
2018	Western Area Urban	Michaella Oladuni	Did not compete		
2017	Western Area Urban	Abie Mansaray	Unplaced		
2016	Kenema	Maseray Swarray	Unplaced	Miss International Africa	

=== Miss Earth Sierra Leone ===
- : Declared as Winner
- : Ended as runner-up or top 5/6 qualification
- : Ended as one of the finalists or semifinalists
- : Ended as special awards winner

Year	District	Miss Earth Sierra Leone	Placement at Miss Earth	Special Award(s)	Notes
Swadu Natasha Beckley directorship — a franchise holder to Miss Earth between 2016
2026	TBA				
2025	Bonthe	Abidemi Akannie	Did not compete		
2024	Western Area Urban	Matina Elizabeth Doherty	Did not compete		
2023	Western Area Urban	Mary Juliet Sia Kanessie	Unplaced		
2022	Western Area Urban	Shalom Prosperia Ella John	Unplaced		
2021	Did not compete				
2020	Western Area Urban	Nadiatejanatu Mansaray	Unplaced		
2019	Tokeh	N'jainatu Sesay	Unplaced		
2018	Port Loko	Alma Nancy Sesay	Unplaced	(gold) Best National Costume (Africa)	
2017	Western Area Urban	Ismatu Daramy	Unplaced	(silver) Miss Friendship (Group 1)	
2017	Western Area Urban	Esther Williams	Did not compete		
2016	Port Loko	Josephine Kamara	Unplaced		
Miss Earth Sierra Leone directorship — a franchise holder to Miss Earth between 2007—2014
Did not compete between 2014—2015
2013	Western Area Urban	Mariatu Dukuray	Unplaced		
Did not compete between 2008—2012
2007	Western Area Urban	Theresa Turay	Unplaced		

=== Mister Supranational Sierra Leone ===
- : Declared as Winner
- : Ended as runner-up or top 5/6 qualification
- : Ended as one of the finalists or semifinalists
- : Ended as special awards winner

Year	District	Mister Sierra Leone	Placement at Mister Supranational	Special Award(s)	Notes
Swadu Natasha Beckley directorship — a franchise holder to Mister Supranational since 2021
Did not compete since 2025—Present
2024	Western Area Urban	Uthman Issa Bangura	Top 20	Mister Supranational Africa	Uthman was scheduled to represent Sierra Leone in 2023, but due to lack preparation he finally moved on to Mister Supranational 2024 edition in Poland.
2023	Did not compete				
2022	Western Area Urban	Alhassan Dumbuya	Did not compete		
2021	Bombali	Abu Bakarr Tarawalie	Unplaced	Mister Supranational Africa	

=== Mister World Sierra Leone ===
- : Declared as Winner
- : Ended as runner-up or top 5/6 qualification
- : Ended as one of the finalists or semifinalists
- : Ended as special awards winner

Year	District	Mister Sierra Leone	Placement at Mister World	Special Award(s)	Notes
Did not compete since 2025—Present
2024	Koinadugu	Alhaji Hassan Mansaray	Top 20	People's Choice award — Africa winner; Best Talent (Top 36); Beauty With a Purpose (Top 30); Head-to-Head Challenge (Top 20); Best National Costume (Top 20)	
No International pageant 2020—2023
2019	Western Area Urban	Mohamed Kamanoh	Unplaced		

== See also ==
- Miss Sierra Leone
