= Zaky (surname) =

Zaky is a surname. Notable people with the surname include:

- Adel Zaky (1947–2019), Egyptian Roman Catholic prelate
- Chantal Zaky (born 1988), Jamaican-American model and beauty pageant titleholder
- Hussein Zaky (born 1979), Egyptian handball player
