= Shakira Martin =

Shakira Martin may refer to:

- Shakira Martin (model) (1986–2016), Jamaican model
- Shakira Martin (NUS president) (born 1988), British student politician
