= Miss Grand Malta =

Maltese beauty pageant title

- Formation: 2014
- Type: Beauty pageant
- Headquarters: Valletta
- Location: Malta
- Members: Miss Grand International
- Official language: Maltese; English
- National director: Jeff Francalanza
- Parent organization: Glow Promotions (2014 – 2016)

Miss Grand Malta is a national beauty pageant title awarded to Maltese representatives chosen to compete at the Miss Grand International pageant. The title was first awarded in 2014 to Dajana Laketic, the winner of the Face of Malta 2014 pageant, who was assigned by Alan J Darmanin's event organizer, Glow Promotions, to join the Miss Grand International 2014 contest in Thailand. The other two following representatives were also appointed by the mentioned organizer but from different national pageants.

Since the establishment of Miss Grand International, Malta participated thrice; from 2014 to 2016, but all of its representatives were unplaced.

== History ==
Malta competed at the Miss Grand International for the first time in 2014; it was represented by the winner of the Face of Malta 2014 national pageant, Dajana Laketic, followed by other appointed representatives, Sarah Mercieca and Christine Mifsud in 2015 and 2016, respectively. However, all three representatives received non-placements at the international stages.

From 2014 to 2016, the right to send Maltese candidates to partake in Miss Grand International belonged to a Valletta-based event organizer, Glow Promotions. Since 2017, the license of Miss Grand Maltese has not been purchased by any other organizer, even though the title was awarded as one of the supplementary positions at the Miss Malta pageant in 2021 and 2023. Still, the Miss Malta organizer, Kersten Borg, did not hold the Miss Grand license and the titleholders were not sent internationally.

Gallery

Natalia Galea
Miss Grand Malta 2026

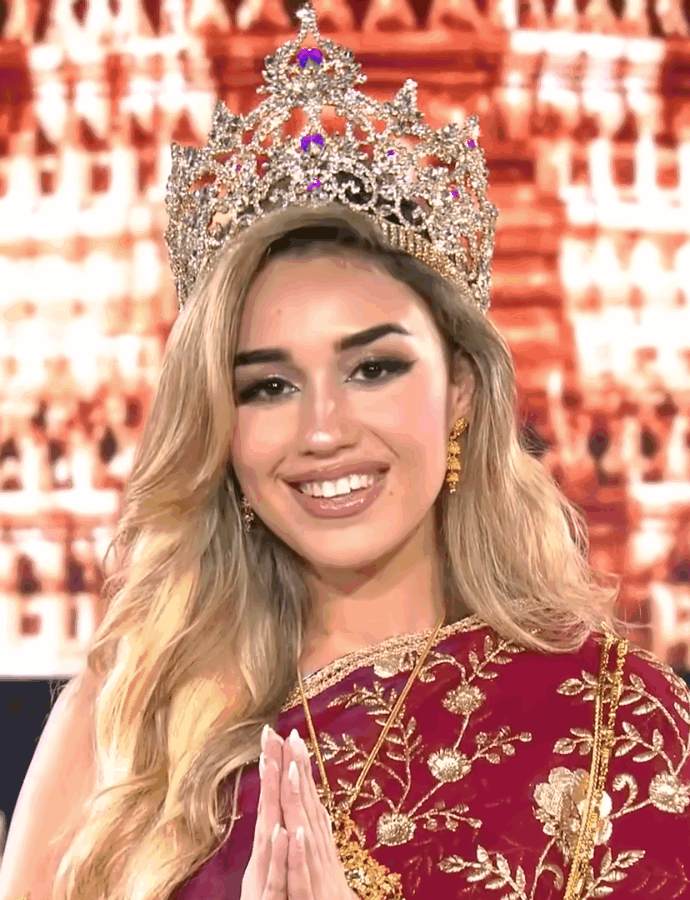
Shailey Micallef
Miss Grand Malta 2025

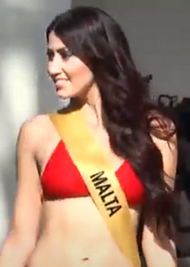
Sarah Mercieca
Miss Grand Malta 2015

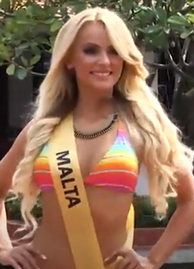
Dajana Laketic
Miss Grand Malta 2014

== International competition ==
The following is a list of Maltese representatives at the Miss Grand International contest.

Color keys

- : Declared as the winner
- : Ended as a runner-up (Top 5)
- : Ended as a finalist (Top 10)
- : Ended as a semifinalist (Top 20)
- : Ended as special awards winner

| Year | Miss Grand Malta | Title | Placement | Special Awards | National Director |
|---|---|---|---|---|---|
| 2025 | Shailey Micallef | Appointed | Unplaced | | Jeef Francalanzao |
| 2023 | Kylie Marie Micallef | Miss Grand Malta 2023 (Note: Runner-up title at the Miss Malta 2023 pageant) | The title was awarded as the supplemental title at the Miss Malta pageant, but the organizer did not hold the license of Miss Grand International for Malta. | | |
| 2021 | Isabelle Borg | Miss Grand Malta 2021 (Note: Runner-up title at the Miss Malta 2021 pageant) | The title was awarded as the supplemental title at the Miss Malta pageant, but the organizer did not hold the license of Miss Grand International for Malta. | | |
Did not compete from 2017–2024
| 2016 | Christine Mifsud | 1st runner-up Miss Malta Universe 2016 | Unplaced | | Alan J. Darmanin |
| 2015 | Sarah Mercieca | Miss Malta 2015 | Unplaced | | Vince Taliana |
| 2014 | Dajana Laketic | Face of Malta 2014 | Unplaced | | Alan J Darmanin |
