= Marie Esther Bangura =

Sierra Leonean beauty queen

- Born: 28 September 1997 (age 29); Port Loko District, Sierra Leone
- Height: 1.80 m (5 ft 11 in)
- Beauty pageant titleholder
- Title: Miss Universe Sierra Leone 2018
- Hair color: Black
- Eye color: Brown
- Major competitions: Miss Universe Sierra Leone 2018 (Winner); Miss Universe 2019 (Unplaced)

Marie Esther Bangura (born September 28, 1997) is a Sierra Leonean beauty pageant titleholder who won the title of Miss Universe Sierra Leone 2018. She was not able to participate at the Miss Universe 2018 pageant as she failed to register due to her late arrival in Thailand, the host nation. She represented Sierra Leone in Miss Universe 2019 instead but was unplaced.

== Pageantry ==
=== Miss Universe Sierra Leone 2018 ===
Marie was crowned Miss Universe Sierra Leone 2018 on the final gala of the pageant held on 19 October 2018. During the competition, she also won the title of Miss Elegance.

=== Miss Universe 2018 ===
As a national representative, Marie was about to participate in Miss Universe 2018 pageant. But she could not reach Thailand, the host nation on time. She had to travel from Sierra Leone, via Ghana, to Nigeria, where she had to apply for a visa in the Royal Thai Embassy. She then had to take a flight from Ethiopia to Bangkok, and she finally arrived almost six days post the registration procedures completed. However, she attended the event as a member of audience.

=== Miss Universe 2019 ===
The national director of Miss Universe Sierra Leone 2018 mentioned at the event of Miss Universe 2018 that Marie will represent Sierra Leone at Miss Universe 2019 pageant which was held on December 8, 2019 at Tyler Perry Studios in Atlanta but failed to place.

Awards and achievements
Preceded by Adama Lakoh Kargbo	Miss Universe Sierra Leone; 2018	Succeeded by

Awards and achievements
Preceded by Virginia Limongi	Miss Tocuyo Awards; 2019	Succeeded by
