= Teresa Ruglio =

Venezuelan model

- Born: January 4, 1996 (age 30); Caracas, Venezuela
- Occupation: Beauty pageant titleholder
- Height: 1.80 m (5 ft 11 in)
- Beauty pageant titleholder
- Title: Miss Universe Malta 2019
- Hair color: Brown
- Eye color: Brown
- Major competitions: Miss Universe Malta 2019 (Winner); Miss Universe 2019 (Unplaced)

Teresa Ruglio Sánchez (born January 4, 1996) is a Venezuelan-Maltese model and beauty pageant titleholder who was crowned Miss Universe Malta 2019. She represented Malta at Miss Universe 2019 competition but Unplaced.

== Early life ==
Ruglio was born in Caracas to an Italo-Venezuelan family originally from Caposele, and holds triple Maltese, Italian and Venezuelan citizenship. Ruglio is the youngest of eleven children and her father Gelsomino died when she was 13. The family left Venezuela and immigrated to Malta in 2016, due to the crisis in Venezuela and kidnapping and murder of her elder brother Bruno in Colombia. After arriving in Malta, the family settled in Sliema and Ruglio began studying English and Maltese.

== Pageantry ==
=== Miss Universe Malta 2019 ===
Ruglio represented the town of Sliema in the Miss Universe Malta 2019 competition held at the Hilton Malta in St. Julian's on 12 July 2019. She went on to win the competition and was crowned Miss Universe Malta at the end of the event by outgoing titleholder Francesca Mifsud. During the competition, Ruglio wished to raise awareness regarding the crisis in Venezuela, and to continue her work as a motivational speaker. She plans to use her past tough experiences to help people to look at the world with a sense of optimism and create positive habits.

=== Miss Universe 2019 ===
Ruglio represented Malta in the Miss Universe 2019 pageant. During the preliminary swimsuit competition, she slipped and nearly avoided falling on stage, along with several other contestants who also stumbled in the same spot. Ruglio ultimately went unplaced.

Awards and achievements
Preceded by Francesca Mifsud	Miss Universe Malta; 2019	Succeeded by Anthea Zammit
