= Raquel Pélissier =

Haitian model

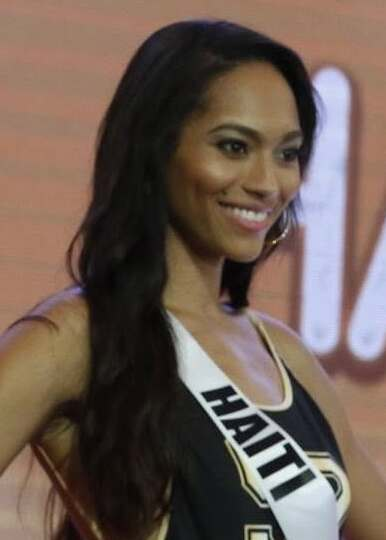
- Pélissier in 2017
- Born: August 21, 1991 (age 35); Port-au-Prince, Haiti
- Height: 1.80 m (5 ft 11 in)
- Beauty pageant titleholder
- Title: Miss Haiti 2016
- Hair color: Black
- Eye color: Brown
- Major competitions: Miss Haiti 2016 (Winner); Reina Hispanoamericana 2016 (3rd Runner-up); Miss Universe 2016 (1st Runner-up)

Raquel Pélissier (born August 21, 1991) is a Haitian model and beauty pageant titleholder who won Miss Haiti 2016. She represented Port-au-Prince at the pageant and represented Haiti at Miss Universe 2016 where she ended as 1st Runner-Up, being the first Haitian delegate to place in the finals in 41 years, with their last placement being back in 1975.

== Personal life ==
Pélissier was born in Haiti. At the age of three, Pélissier was in a 21-day coma, came out of it and was paralyzed for a week. She later survived the 2010 Haiti earthquake.

Pélissier started doing photo shoots for local magazine Rebelle Haiti. In Miss Universe 2016, held in Pasay, Philippines, she was runner-up to France's Iris Mittenaere. Post-Miss Universe, Pélissier has done several pageant-related videos on her YouTube channel, which has almost 7,000 subscribers.

Pélissier has a master's degree in scientific research from Universidad Complutense in Madrid, Spain. She is fluent in English and Spanish, alongside her native tongues of French and Haitian Creole.

Awards and achievements
Preceded by (Colombia) Ariadna Gutiérrez	Miss Universe 1st Runner-Up; 2016	Succeeded by (Colombia) Laura González
Preceded by Lisa Drouillard	Miss Haiti; 2016	Succeeded by Cassandra Chéry
