= Miss Universe Jamaica =

National beauty pageant selecting Jamaica's Miss Universe representative

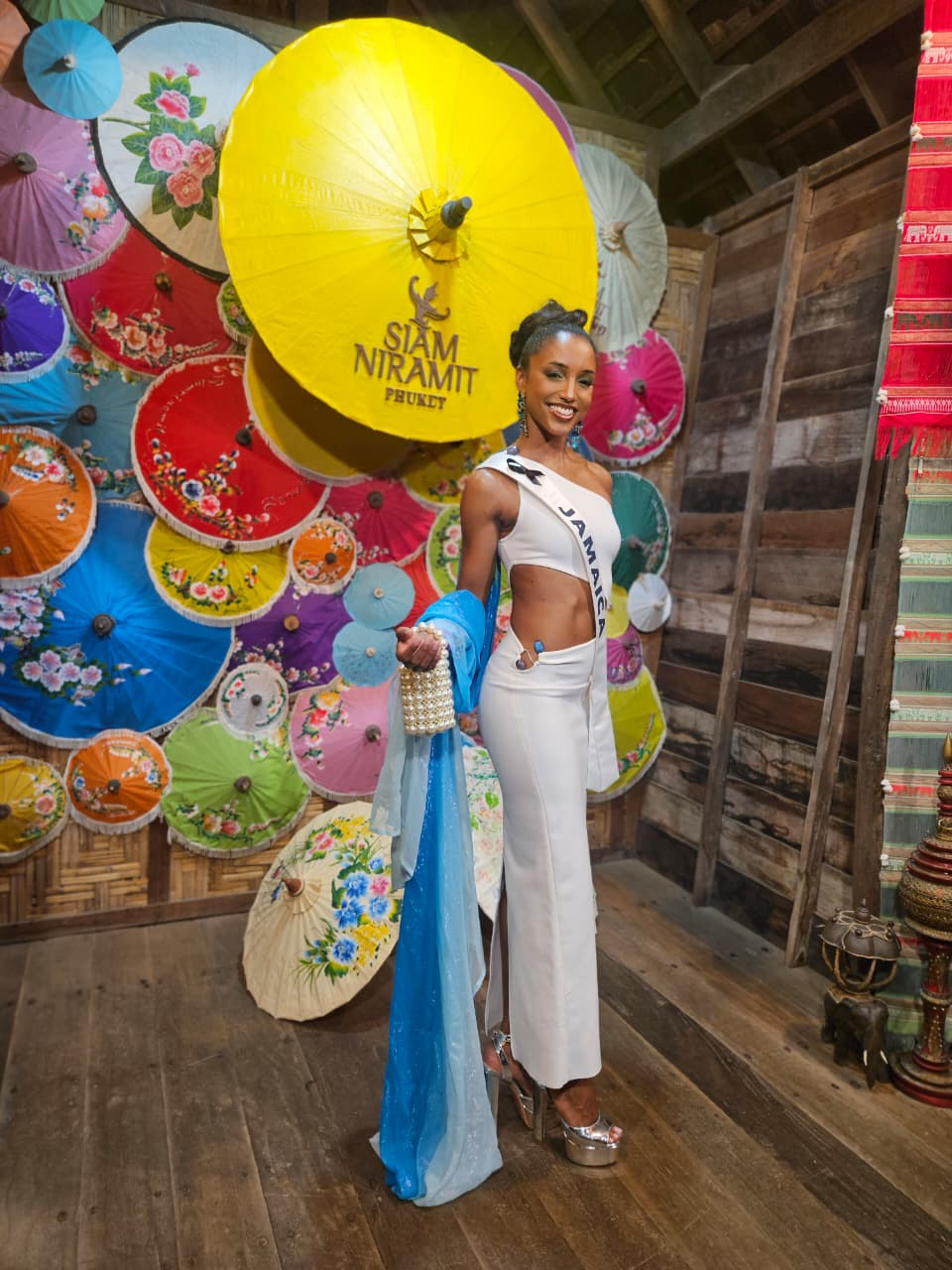
- Gabrielle Henry, Miss Universe Jamaica 2025
- Formation: 1961; 65 years ago
- Type: Beauty pageant
- Headquarters: Kingston
- Location: Jamaica
- Members: Miss Universe
- Official language: English
- National Directors: Karl Williams and Mark McDermoth (Uzuri International / Atelier Dermoth Williams Limited)
- Website: missuniversejamaica.org

Miss Universe Jamaica 2026
Current titleholder	Celene Hall (2026)
Crowned	23 August 2026, Kingston
Predecessor	Gabrielle Henry (2025)
Successor	TBD (2027)
Affiliation	Miss Universe
Broadcaster	Television Jamaica (TVJ)
Title sponsor	Hyundai Jamaica
Highest placement	1st Runner-Up – Yendi Phillipps (2010)

Miss Universe Jamaica (formerly Miss Jamaica Universe) is a beauty pageant that selects the contestant to represent Jamaica at the Miss Universe competition.

== History ==
Although Jamaica started competing at the Miss Universe Pageant in 1961, the Miss Universe Jamaica pageant officially started in 1982 and was organised by Ed Wallace to select the official representative. This was won by Nancy Martin who was slated to compete at the Miss Universe pageant, but was unable to do so. The contest was again held from 1986 to 1988, and in 1989 Pulse was asked to host the Jamaica preliminary to Miss Universe. They went on to post an outstanding record, producing 4 top 10 finalists (Sandra Foster, Kimberley Mais, Nicole Haughton and Christine Straw) at the international Pageant. The pageant was then promoted by Invyte Promotions (2010–2011), hotelier Dimitris Kosvogiannis (2012).

=== 2013–present ===
Uzuri International assumed the Miss Universe Jamaica franchise in 2013, acquiring the licence from Dimitris Kosvogiannis shortly before the March 2013 staging of the national competition. Uzuri International was founded in 1998 by Karl Williams and Mark McDermoth, who had designed for the Miss Jamaica World and Miss Universe Jamaica pageants since its inception. Prior to acquiring the franchise, the company had established an international profile: in 2008 Williams and McDermoth designed the opening number gowns for all 112 contestants at the Miss World pageant in Johannesburg. The franchise is operated through Atelier Dermoth Williams Limited, the formal management company identified in 2026 reporting as the official Miss Universe brand administrator in Jamaica.

The organization has sent several of Jamaica's most successful Miss Universe representatives, including Kaci Fennell (2014, 4th runner-up), Davina Bennett (2017, 2nd runner-up), Miqueal-Symone Williams (2020, Top 10), and Jordanne Levy (2023, Top 20).

== Format ==
The pageant is broadcast nationally by Television Jamaica and has been title-sponsored by Hyundai Jamaica in recent editions. Contestants compete in swimwear, evening gown, and interview segments, with sectional awards including personality, media challenge, and altruism categories.

=== 2026 changes ===
In March 2026, Atelier Dermoth Williams Limited announced a shift from a regional to a parish-level preliminary model for the 2026 edition. Thirteen parish titleholders will qualify automatically for the national finals, scheduled for 23 August 2026 at AC Hotel Kingston, with additional places available through eliminations on 5 July 2026. Parish directors were appointed for each competition area.

== Notable titleholders ==
=== Yendi Phillipps (2010) ===
Yendi Phillipps was crowned Miss Universe Jamaica 2010 under Invyte Promotions and placed first runner-up at Miss Universe 2010 in Las Vegas, Nevada, Jamaica's highest international placement.

=== Kaci Fennell (2014) ===
Kaci Fennell represented Jamaica at Miss Universe 2014 in Doral, Florida, placing fourth runner-up. Her natural hair presentation attracted significant international media coverage during the competition.

=== Davina Bennett (2017) ===
Davina Bennett represented Jamaica at Miss Universe 2017 in Las Vegas, placing second runner-up, Jamaica's second-highest international finish.

=== Gabrielle Henry (2025) ===
Dr. Gabrielle Henry was crowned Miss Universe Jamaica 2025 on 9 August 2025 at the AC Hotel Kingston. An ophthalmology resident at the University Hospital of the West Indies and founder of the See Me Foundation, she won four sectional awards alongside the overall title.

Henry represented Jamaica at the 74th Miss Universe in Nonthaburi, Thailand. On 19 November 2025, during the preliminary evening gown round at the Impact Challenger Hall, she fell through an unguarded opening in the stage floor and was hospitalised in intensive care in Bangkok. On 8 December 2025, the Miss Universe Organization and the Henry family issued a joint statement confirming she had sustained an intracranial haemorrhage, a fracture, a collapsed lung, and facial lacerations, and that the Organization had assumed full and immediate responsibility for the incident. The statement confirmed the Organization had never attributed blame to Henry. She was repatriated to Jamaica in December 2025 under medical escort and remained under outpatient supervision as of March 2026, unable to return to her residency.

== Titleholders ==
- : Declared as Winner
- : Ended as runner-up or top 5/6 qualification
- : Ended as one of the finalists or semifinalists
- : Ended as special awards winner

The Miss Universe Jamaica organization is responsible for sending representatives to Miss Universe. On occasion, when the winner does not qualify (due to age) for either contest, a runner-up is sent.

Year	Parish	Miss Universe Jamaica	Placement at Miss Universe	Special Award(s)	Notes
2026	Portland	Celene Hall	TBA		
2025	Kingston	Gabrielle Henry	Withdrew (injury)		Fell through unmarked stage opening during preliminaries, 19 November 2025; hospitalised in Bangkok ICU. Miss Universe Organization assumed full responsibility.
2024	Saint Mary	Rachel Silvera	Unplaced		
2023	Kingston	Jordanne Levy	Top 20		
2022	Saint Thomas	Toshami Calvin	Unplaced		
2021	Saint Elizabeth	Daena Soares	Unplaced		
2020	Saint Andrew	Miqueal-Symone Williams	Top 10		
2019	Saint James	Iana Tickle Garcia	Unplaced		
2018	Kingston	Emily Maddison	Top 20		
2017	Clarendon	Davina Bennett	2nd Runner-up		
2016	Saint James	Isabel Dalley	Unplaced		
2015	Kingston	Sharlene Rädlein	Unplaced		
2014	Kingston	Kaci Fennell	4th Runner-up		
2013	Kingston	Kerrie Baylis	Unplaced		Karl Williams & Mark McDermoth (Uzuri International) directorship.
2012	Portland	Chantal Zaky	Unplaced		Dimitris Kosvogiannis directorship.
Miss Jamaica Universe
2011	Kingston	Shakira Martin †	Unplaced		
2010	Kingston	Yendi Phillipps	1st Runner-up		Invyte Promotions directorship.
Miss Jamaica Universe
2009	Saint James	Carolyn Yapp	Unplaced		
2008	Kingston	April Jackson	Unplaced		
2007	Kingston	Zahra Redwood	Unplaced		
2006	Kingston	Cindy Wright	Unplaced		
2005	Kingston	Raquel Wright	Unplaced		
2004	Kingston	Christine Straw	Top 10		
2003	Saint James	Michelle Lecky	Unplaced		
2002	Kingston	Sanya Hughes	Unplaced		
2001	Kingston	Zahra Burton	Unplaced		
2000	Clarendon	Saphire Longmore	Unplaced		
1999	Kingston	Nicole Haughton	Top 10		
1998	Kingston	Shani McGraham	Unplaced		
1997	Saint Catherine	Nadine Thomas	Unplaced		
1996	Kingston	Trudi-Ann Ferguson	Unplaced		
1995	Kingston	Justine Willoughby	Unplaced		
1994	Saint James	Angelie Martin	Unplaced		
1993	Kingston	Rachel Stuart	Unplaced		
1992	Kingston	Bridgette Rhoden	Unplaced		
1991	Kingston	Kimberley Mais	Top 6 (4th Place)		
1990	Kingston	Michele Hall	Unplaced		
Miss Jamaica Universe
1989	Kingston	Sandra Foster	Top 10		Kingsley Cooper (Pulse Org.) directorship.
1988	Kingston	Leota Suah	Unplaced		
1987	Kingston	Janice Sewell	Unplaced		
1986	Kingston	Liliana Cisneros	Unplaced		Ronald Waite (Monocot Television Network)
Did not compete between 1983 and 1985
1982	Kingston	Nancy Martin	Did not compete		Miss Jamaica Universe org. – Ed Wallace directorship.
Miss Jamaica
Did not compete between 1977 and 1981
1976	Kingston	Angela Ruddock	Did not compete		
1975	Kingston	Gillian Louise Annette King	Unplaced		
1974	Kingston	Lennox Anne Black	Unplaced		
1973	Saint James	Rita Faye Chambers	Unplaced		
1972	Kingston	Grace Marilyn Wright	Unplaced		
1971	Clarendon	Suzette Marilyn Wright	Unplaced		
1970	Kingston	Sheila Lorna Neil	Unplaced		
1969	Kingston	Carol Gerrow	Unplaced		
1968	Kingston	Marjorie Bromfield	Unplaced		
1967	Kingston	Elham Warwar	Did not compete		During rehearsals, Miss Jamaica, Elham Warwar was informed she had to leave the pageant because neither she nor her national sponsor had shown proof she had won a national competition, which was in the pageant rules.
1966	Kingston	Beverly Savory	Unplaced		
1965	Kingston	Virginia Hope Redpath	Unplaced		
1964	Kingston	Beverly Elaine Rerrie	Unplaced		
1963	Kingston	June Maxime Bowman	Unplaced		
1962	Kingston	Marlene Murray	Did not compete		The First Miss Jamaica 1962 in the year that Jamaica got its Independence, she was not a Jamaica Festival Queen but the first Miss Jamaica Independence Queen.
1961	Kingston	Marguerite LeWars	Unplaced		Miss Jamaica org. – Ken Rhino directorship.

== See also ==
- Miss Jamaica World
- Miss Earth Jamaica
- Miss Grand Jamaica
