= Martrecia Alleyne =

Trinidadian model

- Born: Martrecia Cherisse Alleyne; 1991 (age 34–35); Saint Augustine, Trinidad and Tobago
- Height: 1.70 m (5 ft 7 in)
- Beauty pageant titleholder
- Title: Miss Trinidad & Tobago Universe 2017 - First Runner-up; Miss Trinidad & Tobago Universe 2018
- Hair color: Black
- Eye color: Dark Brown
- Major competitions: Miss Trinidad & Tobago Universe 2017 (First Runner-up); Miss Universe 2018 (Did not compete)

Martrecia Cherisse Alleyne (born 1991 in Saint Augustine) is an Afro–Trinidadians and Tobagonians model and beauty pageant contestant who placed as the First Runner-up of Miss Trinidad & Tobago Universe 2017 in October 2017 in the Trinidad & Tobago.

== Personal life ==
Alleyne lives in Saint Augustine, Trinidad & Tobago. She is former Valedictorian for the Faculty of Social Sciences at the University of the West Indies, St. Augustine.

== Pageantry ==
=== Miss Trinidad & Tobago Universe 2017 ===
Alleyne finished as the 1st Runner-up at Miss Universe Trinidad and Tobago 2017.

Awards and achievements
Preceded by Yvonne Clarke	Miss Trinidad & Tobago Universe; 2018	Succeeded by TBD
