= Sthefany Gutiérrez =

Venezuelan model and beauty pageant titleholder

- Born: Sthefany Yoharlis Gutiérrez Gutiérrez; 10 January 1999 (age 27); Barcelona, Anzoátegui, Venezuela
- Education: Universidad Santa María
- Occupation: Model
- Height: 5 ft 9 in (1.76 m)
- Beauty pageant titleholder
- Title: Miss Venezuela 2017
- Hair color: Black
- Eye color: Brown
- Major competitions: Miss Venezuela 2017; (Winner); Miss Universe 2018; (2nd Runner-Up); MGI All Stars 1st Edition; (Withdrew)

Sthefany Yoharlis Gutiérrez Gutiérrez (born 10 January 1999) is a Venezuelan actress, model and beauty pageant titleholder who was crowned Miss Venezuela 2017. She represented the state of Delta Amacuro at the pageant and represented Venezuela at the Miss Universe 2018 competition where she placed as the second runner-up.

== Life and career ==
=== Early life ===
Gutiérrez was born in Simón Bolívar Municipality, Anzoátegui. She is the eldest of the two children of Yohan Ricardo Gutiérrez Pardo, who is a native of Colombia and Yadinis Carolina Gutiérrez, from Barcelona, Venezuela. She has a brother, Camilo Andrew. She studied Law at Santa María University in Caracas.

In January 2024, she became engaged to businessman Jorge Alfredo Silva Cardona, at the Estadio Polideportivo de Pueblo Nuevo. They were married on July 13 of that year, on Margarita Island. On September 26 of that same year, she announced her pregnancy; On September 28, they revealed that they were expecting a boy and on December 22, her child was born.

== Pageantry ==
=== Miss Venezuela 2017 ===
At the end of Miss Venezuela 2017 held on November 9, 2017, Gutiérrez was crowned Miss Venezuela 2017. She represented Venezuela in Miss Universe 2018. Gutiérrez succeeded Miss Venezuela 2016 Keysi Sayago and was crowned by her at the final event. Her court included Miss Venezuela World 2018, Veruska Ljubisavljević from Vargas and Miss Venezuela International 2018, Mariem Velazco from Barinas.

=== Miss Universe 2018 ===
In December 2018, she represented Venezuela at the Miss Universe 2018 pageant hosted in Bangkok, Thailand. She had problems with her high heels and the bottom part of her costume, which caused her to trip on stage and made her look uncomfortable. Ultimately, Gutiérrez placed as the second runner-up, making the highest placement for Venezuela since Gabriela Isler's win in 2013.

=== MGI All Stars 1st Edition ===
On April 14, 2026, Miss Grand International confirmed that Gutiérrez will represent Venezuela at the first edition of MGI All Stars. However, she would announce her withdrawal from the competition on May 5 to focus on her personal and familial responsibilities.

Awards and achievements
Preceded by (Jamaica) Davina Bennett	Miss Universe 2nd Runner-Up; 2018	Succeeded by (Mexico) Sofía Aragón
Preceded by Keysi Sayago	Miss Universe Venezuela; 2018	Succeeded by Thalía Olvino
Preceded by Keysi Sayago	Miss Venezuela; 2017	Succeeded by Isabella Rodríguez
Preceded by Ysabel Cedeño	Miss Delta Amacuro; 2017	Succeeded by Ana Karina Noguera
