= Davina Bennett =

International model and beauty pageant titleholder

- Born: Davina Bennett; 5 March 1996 (age 30); Clarendon, Jamaica
- Education: University of the West Indies
- Height: 1.78 m (5 ft 10 in)
- Beauty pageant titleholder
- Title: Miss Jamaica Universe 2017
- Hair color: Black
- Eye color: Dark brown
- Major competitions: Miss Jamaica Universe 2017; (Winner); Miss Universe 2017; (2nd Runner-Up)

Davina Bennett (born 5 March 1996) is a Jamaican model and beauty pageant titleholder who won Miss Jamaica Universe 2017. She represented Jamaica at the Miss Universe 2017 pageant where she was placed second runner-up and the first black woman to be placed rocking her natural afro hair in the Miss Universe competition.

== Pageantry ==
=== Miss Universe Jamaica 2017 ===
Bennett was crowned Miss Universe Jamaica 2017. She succeeded outgoing Miss Universe Jamaica 2016 Isabel Dalley.

=== Miss Universe 2017 ===
Bennett represented Jamaica at Miss Universe 2017 where she was named Second Runner-Up.

During the first question and answer round, Bennett was asked by host Steve Harvey, "Sexual harassment has been at the forefront of recent headlines. Why is it important for men and women to work together in tackling this issue?" Bennett answered:

"Sexual harassment is a form of abuse and no abuse should be tolerated whether in the workplace or in society. I believe that men and women should come together and be professional, leave this act alone, and anything that happens, such as sexual harassment, should be taken into the law and should be dealt with. Thank you."

In the final round Bennett was asked the question - "What quality in yourself are you most proud of and how will you apply that quality to your time as Miss Universe?" Bennett answered:

Thank you. The most quality that I'm most appreciative of is my drive, my determination. I am the founder of a foundation that spreads awareness for the deaf community and this platform is such a great platform to just let persons know that these persons need opportunities and need equal opportunities as those in society. And so Miss Universe competition will be the platform for me to use this foundation to spread awareness for all the deaf people around. Thank you.

To note, Bennett finished as second runner-up to South Africa's Demi-Leigh Nel-Peters as Miss Universe 2017.

Awards and achievements
Preceded by (Colombia) Andrea Tovar	Miss Universe 2nd Runner-Up; 2017	Succeeded by (Venezuela) Sthefany Gutiérrez
Preceded by Isabel Dalley	Miss Jamaica Universe; 2017	Succeeded by Emily Maddison
