= Keysi Sayago =

Venezuelan model and beauty pageant titleholder

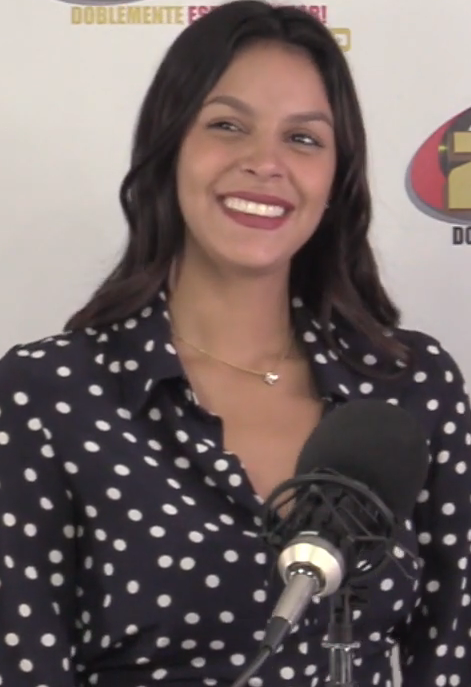
- Sayago in 2019
- Born: Carrizal, Miranda, Venezuela
- Occupation: Mechanical Engineer • Model
- Height: 1.78 m (5 ft 10 in)
- Children: 1
- Beauty pageant titleholder
- Title: Miss Venezuela 2016
- Hair color: Black
- Eye color: Hazel
- Major competitions: Miss Venezuela 2016; (Winner); Miss Universe 2017; (Top 5)

Keysi Mairin Sayago Arrechedera (born 6 October 1993), known as Keysi Sayago, is a Venezuelan beauty pageant titleholder who won Miss Venezuela 2016. She represented Venezuela at the Miss Universe 2017, among in the placed Top 5 finalist.

== Early life and education ==
Sayago was born on October 6, 1993, in Carrizal Municipality; where she remained until his parents, Alex Rubén Sayago (1966) and Ana Karina Arrechedera (1970) decided to move to Los Teques. She has a sister: Ana Karina (1989) and three paternal half-brothers. She was enrolled in modeling classes at age 12.

Sayago has a bachelor's degree in mechanical engineering from National Experimental University of the Armed Forces in Los Teques, Miranda.

In October 2017, she settled in Canada to continue her career as a professional model.

In April 2021, she met Canadian businessman Gary LeBlanc. They married on July 25, 2022, with a subsequent celebration; on September 23, 2023, in Toronto. On January 1, 2024, she announced that she was pregnant. On February 14, she revealed that she was having a girl. On June 12, Emma was born and on September 2 of that year; announced that she had been diagnosed with hip dysplasia.

== Career ==
=== Modeling ===
Sayago participated in and won the first edition of the beauty contest American Model Venezuela 2010, organized by the model agency Xtreme Model.

=== Pageantry ===
==== Miss Monagas ====
Sayago was pre-selected during the Miss Miranda casting and assigned Miss Monagas title.

==== Miss Venezuela 2016 ====
Sayago won Miss Venezuela 2016, competing as Miss Monagas 2016, one of 24 finalists in her country's national beauty pageant. She also won Miss Attitude and Most Beautiful Smile at the Interactive Beauty Gala, at the Miss Venezuela 2016 preliminary, which was held on October 6, 2016, in Caracas, She became the second Miss Venezuela winner to represent the state of Monagas. She represented the state of Monagas at the pageant and represented Venezuela at the Miss Universe 2017.

==== Miss Universe 2017 ====
Sayago represented Venezuela at Miss Universe 2017 on November 26, 2017, at The AXIS in Las Vegas, Nevada she made wildcards in top sixteen swimsuit competition, narrow top ten for evening gown, and the top five q&a reached top five finalist.

=== 2017–present ===
In June 2017, she debuted as a TV presenter in the tenth season of Más allá de la Belleza, in a program about Miss Venezuela.

On August 18, 2018, she was a judge at Miss Canada 2018.

In October 2018 and February 2019, she appeared at the Toronto Fashion Week.

Awards and achievements
| Preceded by (Kenya) Mary Esther Were (Philippines) Maxine Medina (Thailand) Chalita Suansane (Top 6) | Miss Universe Top 5 Finalist (with (Thailand) Maria Poonlertlarp); 2017 | Succeeded by (Puerto Rico) Kiara Ortega (Vietnam) H'Hen Niê |
| Preceded by Mariam Habach | Miss Universe Venezuela; 2017 | Succeeded by Sthefany Gutiérrez |
| Preceded by Mariam Habach, Lara | Miss Venezuela; 2016 | Succeeded by Sthefany Gutiérrez, Delta Amacuro |
| Preceded by Valeria Vespoli | Miss Monagas; 2016 | Succeeded by María Guevara |
