= Miss Universe 2018 =

67th edition of the Miss Universe competition

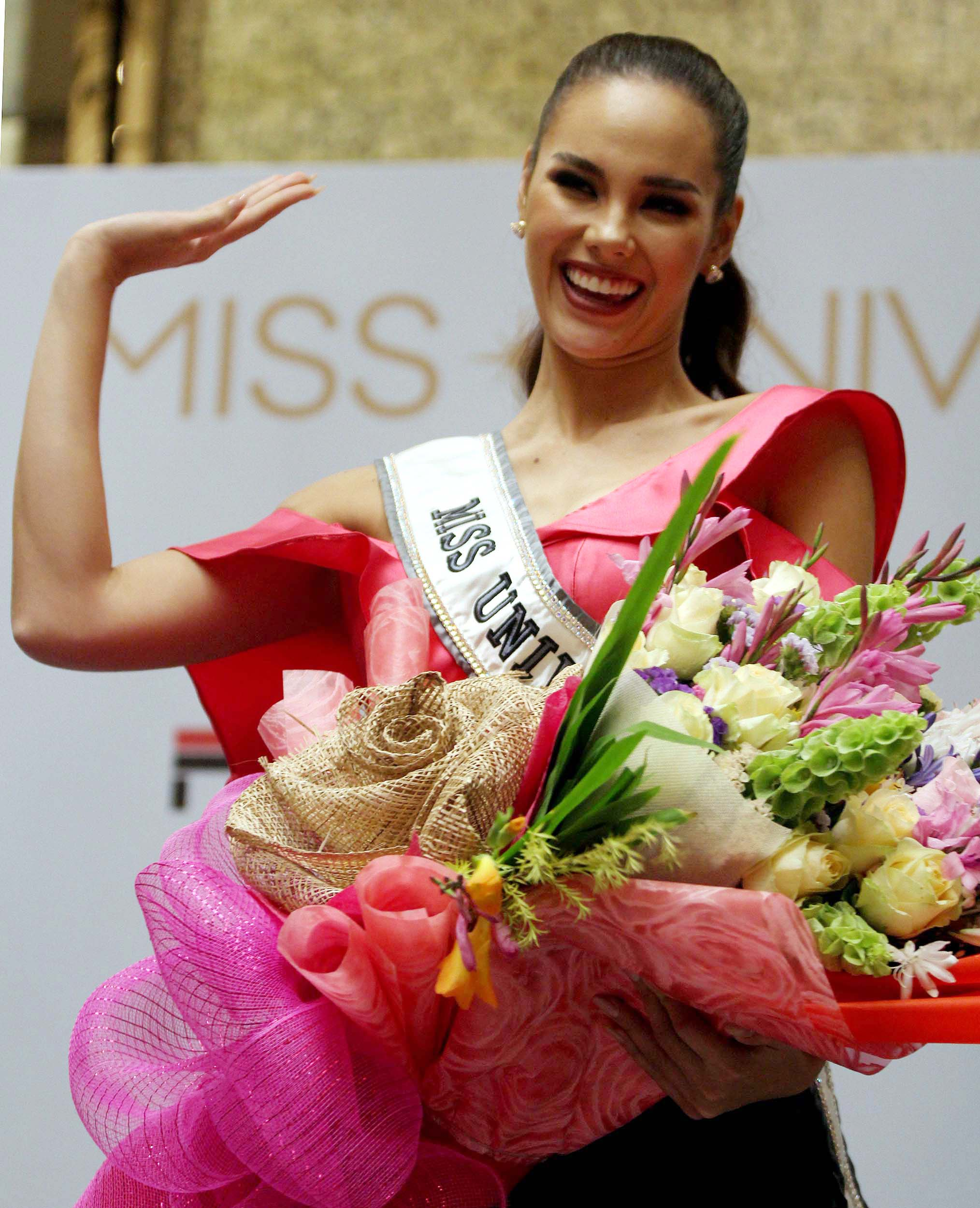
- Catriona Gray
- Date: 17 December 2018
- Presenters: Steve Harvey; Ashley Graham; Carson Kressley; Lu Sierra
- Entertainment: Ne-Yo
- Venue: Impact Arena, Muang Thong Thani, Pak Kret, Nonthaburi, Thailand
- Broadcaster: International: Fox; Azteca; Official broadcaster: PPTV
- Entrants: 94
- Placements: 20
- Debuts: Armenia; Kyrgyzstan; Mongolia
- Withdrawals: Austria; Ethiopia; Guyana; Iraq; Romania; Slovenia; Tanzania; Trinidad and Tobago
- Returns: Belize; Denmark; Greece; Hungary; Kenya; Kosovo; Switzerland
- Winner: Catriona Gray; Philippines
- Congeniality: Ornella Gunesekere, Sri Lanka
- Best National Costume: On-anong Homsombath, Laos

Miss Universe 2018 was the 67th Miss Universe pageant, held at the Impact Arena, Muang Thong Thani in Pak Kret, Nonthaburi, Thailand, on 17 December 2018. (Note: The event was held at 07:00 local time (UTC+07:00); for the Americas, the day was still 16 December in their local times. However, the Eastern/Central primetime telecast was delayed by 30 minutes due to Fox NFL Sunday overruns.)

The contest was won by Catriona Gray of the Philippines, and was crowned Miss Universe 2018 by Demi-Leigh Nel-Peters of South Africa, this marked the Philippines's fourth win at the contest. The 1st Runner-Up was Tamaryn Green of South Africa, and the 2nd Runner-Up was Sthefany Gutiérrez of Venezuela.

Contestants from ninety-four countries and territories competed in this year's pageant, surpassing the previous record of ninety-two in 2017. The pageant was hosted by Steve Harvey in his fourth consecutive year, along with supermodel Ashley Graham. Television personality Carson Kressley and runway coach Lu Sierra provided commentary and analysis throughout the event. American singer-songwriter Ne-Yo performed in this year's pageant.

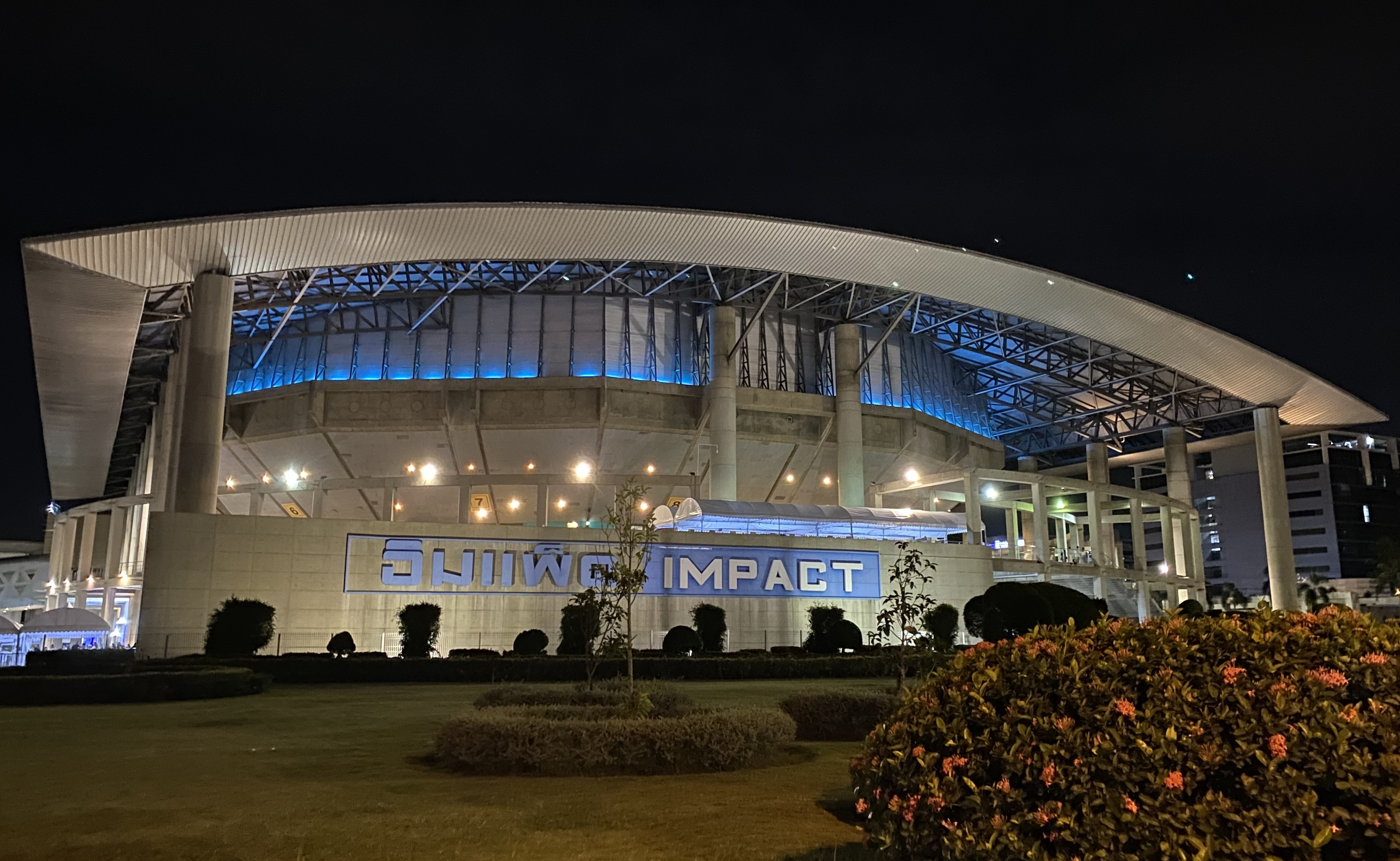
Impact Arena, Muang Thong Thani, the venue of Miss Universe 2018

== Background ==
=== Location and date ===
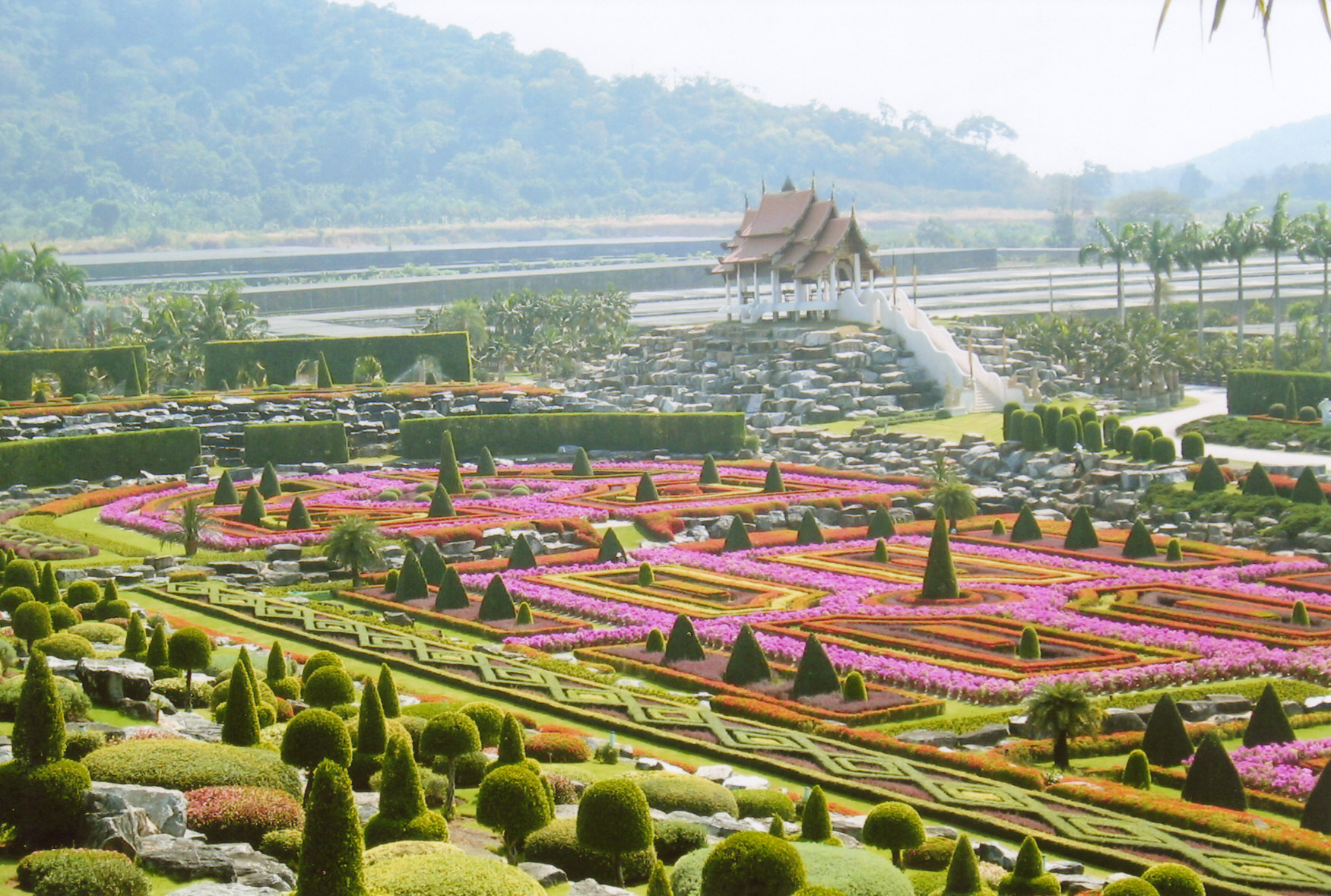
Nong Nooch Tropical Botanical Garden, the venue of the national costume round

The Miss Universe Organization was in talks to host the pageant in China. Negotiations collapsed after the Chinese refused to broadcast the pageant live. Afterward, the Miss Universe Organization opened negotiations with the Philippines after they had previously hosted Miss Universe 2016.

In April 2018, then-Secretary of Tourism Wanda Tulfo Teo spoke with President of the Philippines Rodrigo Duterte regarding the possibility of hosting the pageant in Boracay in November. On 6 May, Tulfo-Teo announced that the Philippines had a "90% chance" of hosting the pageant and also disclosed that the tourism department would be looking for sponsors since the LCS Holdings Inc. of Chavit Singson, the major sponsor of Miss Universe 2016, had declined to finance the 2018 pageant. On 18 May, Tulfo-Teo's successor Bernadette Romulo-Puyat announced that the country dropped the hosting bid due to budget constraints and other concerns. Romulo-Puyat also pointed out that the Philippines had hosted the pageant recently in 2016, and had no reason to do so again so soon.

On 31 July, Miss Universe Organization President, Paula Shugart announced in a live press conference at the Bangkok Art and Culture Centre that the 2018 pageant would be held in Bangkok, Thailand on 17 December. The city had previously hosted the Miss Universe pageant twice, in 1992 and 2005. The reigning Miss Universe Demi-Leigh Nel-Peters with Miss Universe 1965 Apasra Hongsakula and Miss Universe 2005 Natalie Glebova participated in the announcement. The national costume competition took place on 10 December 2018 at the Nong Nooch Tropical Garden in Pattaya, Thailand.

=== Selection of participants ===
Contestants from ninety-four countries and territories were selected to compete in the pageant. Nine of these delegates were appointees to their titles after being a runner-up of their national pageant or an audition process or other internal selection.

Ángela Ponce of Spain was the first openly transgender delegate to compete in the pageant. Despite not being one of the twenty semi-finalists, Ponce was recognized by the Miss Universe Organization for her historical importance during the competition. The pageant rules were changed to allow transgender women to compete in 2012.

==== Replacements ====
Zoé Brunet, the first runner-up of Miss Belgium 2018, was appointed to represent Belgium after Miss Belgium 2018 Angeline Flor Pua chose to compete in Miss World 2018. Eva Colas of France and Magdalena Swat were also appointees to their titles after their original titleholders, Miss France 2018 Maëva Coucke and Miss Polonia 2017 Agata Biernat respectively, were unable to compete because of commitments to Miss World 2018. Coucke and Pua competed in the pageant the following year.

==== Debuts, returns and withdrawals ====
The 2018 edition saw the debuts of Armenia, Kyrgyzstan, and Mongolia and the returns of Belize, Denmark, Greece, Hungary, Kenya, Kosovo, and Switzerland. Greece last competed in Miss Universe 2015, and the others in Miss Universe 2016.

Austria, Ethiopia, Iraq, Romania, Slovenia, and Tanzania withdrew after their respective organizations lost their Miss Universe license, failed to hold a national competition or designate a contestant. Guyana was suspended from participating in Miss Universe due to a controversy involving "nasty emails" and "death threats" sent to the organization over a delegate issue in 2017. No license holder replaced the previous license holder, forcing the country to withdraw. Trinidad and Tobago withdrew after they announced that there would be no pageant held, despite Martrecia Alleyne having crowned as Miss Universe Trinidad and Tobago 2018 at their 2017 national pageant.

Marie Esther Bangura of Sierra Leone arrived in Bangkok after registrations had ended, and was unable to participate due to visa and logistical concerns. However, she was allowed to participate in the pageant's activities and watch the competition from the audience. She was also invited to compete in the next edition of the pageant.

== Results ==
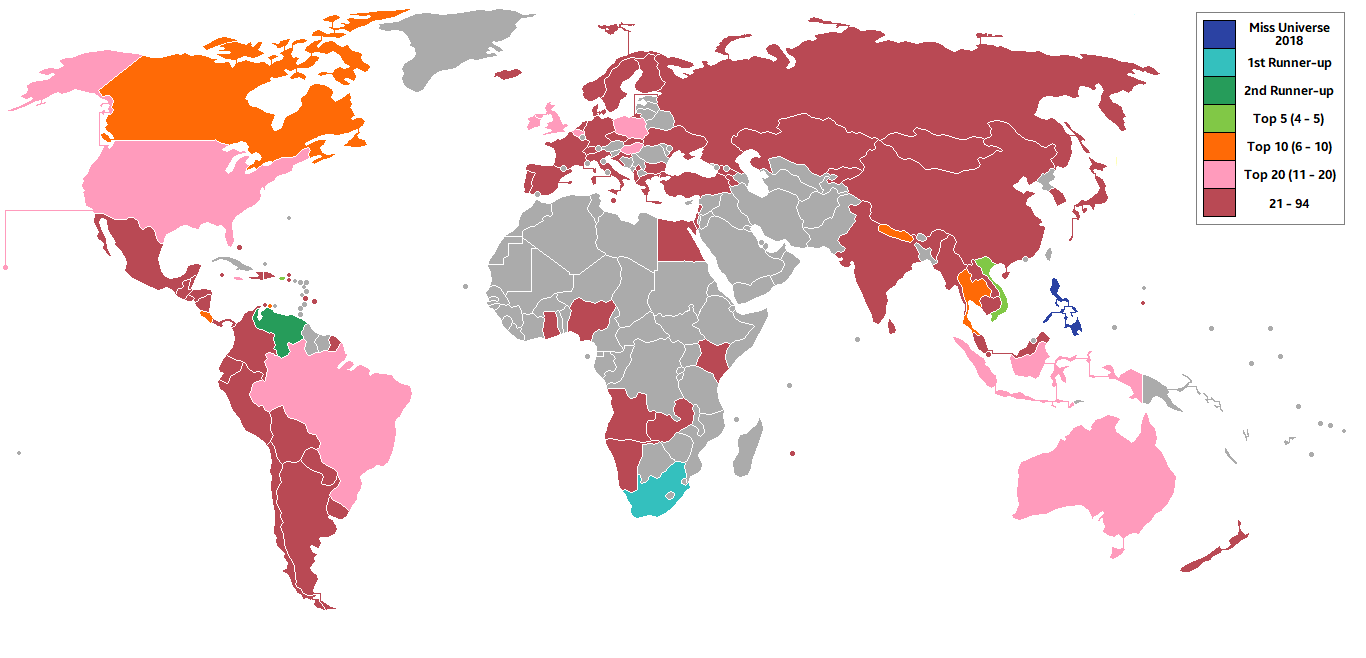
Participating countries and territories.

=== Placements ===
Placement	Contestant
Miss Universe 2018	Philippines – Catriona Gray
1st Runner-Up	South Africa – Tamaryn Green
2nd Runner-Up	Venezuela – Sthefany Gutiérrez
Top 5	Puerto Rico – Kiara Ortega; Vietnam – H'Hen Niê
Top 10	Canada – Marta Stępień; Costa Rica – Natalia Carvajal; Curaçao – Akisha Albert; Nepal – Manita Devkota; Thailand – Sophida Kanchanarin
Top 20	Australia – Francesca Hung; Belgium – Zoé Brunet; Brazil – Mayra Dias; Great Britain – Dee-Ann Kentish-Rogers; Hungary – Enikő Kecskés; Indonesia – Sonia Fergina Citra; Ireland – Grainne Gallanagh; Jamaica – Emily Maddison; Poland – Magdalena Swat; United States – Sarah Summers

=== Special awards ===
Award	Contestant
Best National Costume	Laos – On-anong Homsombath
Miss Congeniality	Sri Lanka – Ornella Gunesekere

== Pageant ==
=== Format ===
The number of semifinalists was increased to twenty— the same number of semifinalists in 2006. The results of the preliminary competition— which was composed of the swimsuit and evening gown competition and closed-door interviews, determined the twenty semifinalists. The continental format was retained, with five semifinalists from the Americas, Europe, Africa & Asia-Pacific, and wildcards coming from any continental region. The twenty semifinalists competed in the opening statement round, after which the judges narrowed down the semifinalists to ten, who then competed in both swimsuit and evening gown competitions. After the swimwear and evening gown competitions, the judges then selected the top five to compete in the preliminary question and answer round. After said segment, the judges selected the final three, who participated in the final word and final look portions.

=== Selection committee ===
The seven judges for both the preliminary competition and the final telecast were an all-female panel which included:

- Liliana Gil Valletta – businesswoman
- Janaye Ingram – political organizer and Miss New Jersey USA 2004
- Monique Lhuillier – fashion designer
- Michelle McLean – Miss Universe 1992 from Namibia
- Iman Oubou – scientist, entrepreneur, and medical missionary
- Bui Simon – Miss Universe 1988 from Thailand
- Richelle Singson-Michael – Filipino architect and businesswoman

== Contestants ==
Ninety-four contestants competed for the title.

Country/Territory	Contestant	Age	Hometown	Continental Group
Albania	Trejsi Sejdini	18	Elbasan	Europe
Angola	Ana Liliana Avião	24	Andulo	Africa & Asia-Pacific
Argentina	Agustina Pivowarchuk	22	Buenos Aires	Americas
Armenia	Eliza Muradyan	25	Etchmiadzin	Europe
Aruba	Kimberly Julsing	20	Wayaca	Americas
Australia	Francesca Hung	24	Sydney	Africa & Asia-Pacific
(The Bahamas) Bahamas	Danielle Grant	23	Nassau	Americas
Barbados	Meghan Theobalds	27	Christ Church	Americas
Belgium	Zoé Brunet	18	Namur	Europe
Belize	Jenelli Fraser	27	Belize City	Americas
Bolivia	Joyce Prado	21	Santa Cruz	Americas
Brazil	Mayra Dias	27	Itacoatiara	Americas
British Virgin Islands	A'yana Phillips	23	Sea Cows Bay	Americas
Bulgaria	Gabriela Topalova	22	Plovdiv	Europe
Cambodia	Rern Nat	22	Kampong Cham	Africa & Asia-Pacific
Canada	Marta Stępień	24	Windsor	Americas
Cayman Islands	Caitlin Tyson	24	Bodden Town	Americas
Chile	Andrea Díaz	27	Santiago	Americas
China	Meisu Qin	24	Anshan	Africa & Asia-Pacific
Colombia	Valeria Morales	20	Cali	Americas
Costa Rica	Natalia Carvajal	28	San Jose	Americas
Croatia	Mia Pojatina	23	Nova Gradiška	Europe
Curaçao	Akisha Albert	23	Willemstad	Americas
Czech Republic	Lea Šteflíčková	20	Prague	Europe
Denmark	Helena Heuser	22	Copenhagen	Europe
Dominican Republic	Aldy Bernard	23	Laguna Salada	Americas
Ecuador	Virginia Limongi	24	Portoviejo	Americas
Egypt	Nariman Khaled	22	Hurghada	Africa & Asia-Pacific
El Salvador	Marisela de Montecristo	26	San Salvador	Americas
Finland	Alina Voronkova	23	Helsinki	Europe
France	Eva Colas	22	Bastia	Europe
(Georgia (country)) Georgia	Lara Yan	25	Telavi	Europe
Germany	Céline Willers	25	Munich	Europe
Ghana	Akpene Diata Hoggar	25	Tefle	Africa & Asia-Pacific
(United Kingdom) Great Britain	Dee-Ann Kentish-Rogers	25	Birmingham	Europe
Greece	Ioanna Bella	22	Veria	Europe
Guam	Athena McNinch	20	Mangilao	Africa & Asia-Pacific
Guatemala	Mariana García	19	Guatemala City	Americas
Haiti	Samantha Colas	26	Port-au-Prince	Americas
Honduras	Vanessa Villars	20	Santa Bárbara	Americas
Hungary	Enikő Kecskés	21	Budapest	Europe
Iceland	Katrín Lea Elenudóttir	19	Reykjavík	Europe
India	Nehal Chudasama	22	Mumbai	Africa & Asia-Pacific
Indonesia	Sonia Fergina Citra	26	Tanjung Pandan	Africa & Asia-Pacific
(Republic of Ireland) Ireland	Grainne Gallanagh	24	Buncrana	Europe
Israel	Nikol Reznikov	18	Afula	Africa & Asia-Pacific
Italy	Erica De Matteis	24	Rome	Europe
Jamaica	Emily Maddison	19	Saint Andrew	Americas
Japan	Yuumi Kato	22	Aichi	Africa & Asia-Pacific
Kazakhstan	Sabina Azimbayeva	18	Almaty	Europe
Kenya	Wabaiya Kariuki	22	Nairobi	Africa & Asia-Pacific
Kosovo	Zana Berisha	24	Suhareke	Europe
Kyrgyzstan	Begimay Karybekova	20	Bishkek	Africa & Asia-Pacific
Laos	On-anong Homsombath	23	Vientiane Prefecture	Africa & Asia-Pacific
Lebanon	Maya Reaidy	23	Tannourine	Africa & Asia-Pacific
Malaysia	Jane Teoh	21	Penang	Africa & Asia-Pacific
Malta	Francesca Mifsud	22	Żejtun	Europe
Mauritius	Varsha Ragoobarsing	28	Flacq	Africa & Asia-Pacific
Mexico	Andrea Toscano	20	Manzanillo	Americas
Mongolia	Dolgion Delgerjav	27	Ulaanbaatar	Africa & Asia-Pacific
Myanmar	Hnin Thway Yu Aung	22	Bago	Africa & Asia-Pacific
Namibia	Selma Kamanya	21	Windhoek	Africa & Asia-Pacific
Nepal	Manita Devkota	23	Gorkha	Africa & Asia-Pacific
Netherlands	Rahima Dirkse	25	Rotterdam	Europe
New Zealand	Estelle Curd	27	Auckland	Africa & Asia-Pacific
Nicaragua	Adriana Paniagua	23	Chinandega	Americas
Nigeria	Aramide Lopez	21	Lagos	Africa & Asia-Pacific
Norway	Susanne Guttorm	22	Karasjok	Europe
Panama	Rosa Montezuma	25	Alto Caballero	Americas
Paraguay	Belén Alderete	24	Asunción	Americas
Peru	Romina Lozano	21	Bellavista	Americas
Philippines	Catriona Gray	24	Oas	Africa & Asia-Pacific
Poland	Magdalena Swat	27	Ostrowiec Świętokrzyski	Europe
Portugal	Filipa Barroso	20	Setúbal	Europe
Puerto Rico	Kiara Ortega	25	Rincón	Americas
Russia	Yulia Polyachikhina	18	Cheboksary	Europe
Saint Lucia	Angella Dalsou	24	Castries	Americas
Singapore	Zahra Khanum	23	Singapore City	Africa & Asia-Pacific
Slovakia	Barbora Hanová	24	Lučenec	Europe
South Africa	Tamaryn Green	24	Paarl	Africa & Asia-Pacific
South Korea	Ji-hyun Baek	25	Daegu	Africa & Asia-Pacific
Spain	Ángela Ponce	27	Seville	Europe
Sri Lanka	Ornella Gunesekere	26	Mount Lavinia	Africa & Asia-Pacific
Sweden	Emma Strandberg	22	Hallstahammar	Europe
Switzerland	Jastina Doreen Riederer	20	Spreitenbach	Europe
Thailand	Sophida Kanchanarin	23	Bangkok	Africa & Asia-Pacific
Turkey	Tara De Vries	20	Istanbul	Europe
Ukraine	Karyna Zhosan	23	Odesa	Europe
United States	Sarah Summers	24	Omaha	Americas
United States Virgin Islands	Aniska Tonge	27	Charlotte Amalie	Americas
Uruguay	Sofía Marrero	18	Canelones	Americas
Venezuela	Sthefany Gutiérrez	19	Barcelona	Americas
Vietnam	H'Hen Niê	26	Đắk Lắk	Africa & Asia-Pacific
Zambia	Melba Shakabozha	23	Lusaka	Africa & Asia-Pacific
