= Liliana Gil Valletta =

American businesswoman, Hispanic market expert

- Born: 1976 or 1977 (age 48–49); Bogotá, Colombia
- Education: MBA
- Alma mater: Southwestern Adventist University (SWAU), University of Colorado, and The John F. Kennedy School of Government at Harvard University.
- Occupations: Chief Executive Officer of Culture+ Group, conglomerate including CIEN+ And Culturintel, independent television contributor for various networks
- Television: Seen on Fox News Channel, Fox Business, CNN en Español, among others
- Board member of: Independent Director ZUMIEZ (NASDQ: ZUMZ), RCN Television, AUA Private Equity, Board of Trustees SWAU, Chairwoman FRIENDS of the American Latino Museum
- Awards: Top 100 Most Influential Latinas 2021; Hispanic Businessperson of the Year by the U.S. Hispanic Chamber of Commerce
- Website: lilianagil.com

Liliana "Lili" Gil Valletta (born 1976 or 1977) is a former corporate executive turned entrepreneur and independent board director. She is the co-founder and CEO of the cultural intelligence market research tech-firm CulturIntel and the global cultural marketing agency CIEN+, which have become a global conglomerate called Culture+ Group, a family of Cultural Intelligence companies. She is also a TED speaker, and a regular television business and politics commentator seen on Fox News Channel, Fox Business Network, NTN24, and CNN en Español among others.

== Education and career ==
Originally from Bogotá, Colombia, Liliana Gil immigrated to the United States as a teenager. She attended Southwestern Adventist University, earning a Bachelor’s in Business, as well as an Master of Business Administration from the University of Colorado. As a Young Global Leader selected by the World Economic Forum, she also completed the WEF exclusive Global Leadership and Public Policy Executive Program at The Harvard Kennedy School. Valletta spent most of her career at Johnson & Johnson where she held positions including the global marketing services director, co-founded the company's Hispanic employee business resource group The Hispanic Organization for Leadership and Achievement (HOLA), and launched “Proyecto MAS2”, a pioneering initiative to quantify the business case for doing multicultural marketing and bring increased visibility to the Hispanic segment of the company's customer base, particularly within the pharmaceutical sector.

In 2010, with business partner Enrique Arbelaez, Valletta co-founded XL Alliance and rebranded to CIEN+ in 2016. The company is a cultural intelligence firm offering data-analytics, business strategy, and cross-cultural marketing primarily serving Fortune 500 Clients like Google, Johnson & Johnson, Prudential, Nestlé, Merck, UnitedHealth Group, among others. The firm is 100 percent minority owned and woman owned. The company currently has offices in New York City, Dallas, Los Angeles, Miami, Denver, and Colombia.

== Media appearances and public speaking ==
Valletta has appeared in the media, including on FOX News, MSNBC and CNN. She has appeared in Spanish-speaking media for networks including Univision, Telemundo, Television Dominicana, Telemicro Internacional, Caracol Television and NTN24 Noticias. She is also an independent contributor for the Huffington Post and Fox News Latino.

Valletta is the creator of the YouTube channel Moments to CultuRise with marketing insights, data, news and commentary about cultural intelligence and cultural trends in business. Valletta has also spoken before organizations and universities. Valletta has frequently mentioned the idea of the "Brown Elephant" in the room, which represents a fast approaching majority-minority market that is often being ignored in business, despite the fact that it's growing in size and income.

In 2019, Gil Valletta formed part of the selection committee of the Miss Universe 2018 in the Impact, Muang Thong Thani, Nonthaburi Province, Thailand, transmitted on FOX.

== Awards ==
In 2018 Valletta received the highest recognition by the U.S. Hispanic Chamber of Commerce as 2018 Hispanic Business Person of the Year, Women Power 100 as one of the most powerful women of New York, and in 2018 received the New York Women of Excellence Award by the New York Women's Chamber of Commerce. In 2017 PRWeek named her Top 50 Most Influential in Healthcare for her work in data analytics and patient insights enabled by artificial intelligence. In 2008, Valletta was named in PODER Magazine's Top 20 Under 40. In 2009, she was named Business Woman of the Year Award by Latin Pride Awards, an Outstanding Business Woman by the National Association of Professional Women, and received the Latina Leadership Award from the League of United Latin American Citizens (LULAC). In 2011, she won a Latino Trendsetter Award. In 2013, she was named one of New York's 25 Top Rising Latinos by Latino Leaders Magazine.

== Affiliations ==
In 2021, Valletta was appointed as independent director joining the board of RCN Television, part of the Ardila Lulle Organization traded under RCNTELEVI. In 2019, Valletta was voted as an independent director joining the board of directors for Zumiez (NASDQ: ZUMZ). Valletta is part of the leas than 1% of public board seats held by a Hispanic woman in the U.S.. In 2011, Valletta was selected by the World Economic Forum as a Young Global Leader. She is a board member of the Women’s Leadership Board of Harvard’s Kennedy School. She is a member of The Global Diversity and Inclusion Foundation, and a member of the National Society of Hispanic MBAs. In 2010 she served as co-chair of St. Jude Children’s Research Hospital's Gala por la Vida NY.

== Personal life ==
Gil was married to former National Football League player and co-founder of Mission Chris Valletta, who was also in season four of The Apprentice.
