= Destinee Arnold =

Belizean beauty pageant titleholder

- Born: Destinee Dominique Arnold
- Beauty pageant titleholder
- Title: Miss International Belize 2012; Miss Universe Belize 2019
- Major competitions: Miss Belize World 2012 (winner); Miss International 2012 (Unplaced); Miss Ethnic World International 2013 (winner); Miss Costa Maya 2013 (winner); Miss Universe Belize 2019 (winner)

Destinee Dominique Arnold is a Belizean beauty pageant titleholder who won Miss Universe Belize 2019. She represented Belize at Miss Universe 2019.

== Pageantry ==
=== Miss International 2012 ===
Arnold represented Belize at Miss International 2012 on October 21, 2012 at Okinawa Prefectural Budokan Arena Building in Okinawa, Japan and was unplaced.

=== Miss Costa Maya 2013 ===
Arnold represented Belize and won at Miss Costa Maya 2013.

=== Miss Universe Belize 2019 ===
Arnold won Miss Universe Belize 2019 held on September 6, 2019 at the Belize City Civic Center. She was crowned by outgoing titleholder Jenelli Fraser.

Awards and achievements
Preceded by Jenelli Fraser	Miss Universe Belize; 2019	Succeeded by Iris Salguero
