= Mariam Habach =

Venezuelan model (born 1996)

- Born: Mariam Habach Santucci; January 26, 1996 (age 30); El Tocuyo, Lara, Venezuela
- Height: 1.80 m (5 ft 11 in)
- Beauty pageant titleholder
- Title: Miss Venezuela 2015
- Hair color: Blonde
- Eye color: Green
- Major competitions: Miss Venezuela 2015; (Winner); Miss Universe 2016; (Unplaced)

Mariam Habach Santucci (born 26 January 1996) is a Venezuelan dentist, model, psychologist, and beauty pageant titleholder who won Miss Venezuela 2015. She also won Señorita Centro Occidental 2016, she also represented Venezuela at Miss Universe 2016.

== Personal life ==
Habach is a dentistry student and was raised along with her two brothers in the city of El Tocuyo. Her father, Antonio, was born in the city of Tartus, Syria and her maternal grandparents immigrated from Fontanarosa and Agrigento, Italy during World War II. Habach speaks three languages: Spanish, Arabic and Italian.

On 20 July 2023, Habach graduated from the University of Yacambú, with an honorable mention Magna Cum Laude in Psychology. She recently graduated as a dentist at the José Antonio Páez University in Carabobo state in 2022.

== Pageantry ==
=== Miss Venezuela 2015 ===
During Venezuela's final coronation night on 8 October 2015, Habach was crowned Miss Venezuela 2015 representing her home state of Lara. She went to represent Venezuela at Miss Universe 2016.

=== Miss Universe 2016 ===
Habach represented Venezuela at Miss Universe 2016 and she was amongst a group of favorites to win the pageant. She also won three special awards given by local sponsors during the pre-pageant activities in the Philippines. During the preliminary competition, she was introduced to the televised press as having won all nine beauty pageants she entered, the current coinciding with her birthday.

Habach is also known to wear the golden Maria Clara terno gown, disputed to having been initially reserved by former Miss Czech Republic Andrea Bezděková, to which its designer finally transferred the gown to Habach. During the national costume competition, she wore a blue and white balloon dress designed by Nidal Nouaihed entitled “Reina encantada del mar”, inspired by the Isla Margarita culture and the myth of the ocean goddess Yemaya, which weighed more than 18 kilos and was made of 120 meters of organza with hundreds of pearls and crystals. However the hugeness of her costume hampered her movements and forced her to constantly kick her dress forward. She ended stuck in the fabric to a point she had to be assisted off stage. Ultimately, Habach did not make placement among the 13 semi-finalists. In thirty three years of Venezuelan pageantry since this time, Habach is the fourth contestant whom did not make placement.

==== Controversy ====
Accordingly, many pageant connoisseurs were bewildered on Habach's non-placement in Miss Universe, resulting in being pejoratively labeled as the recipient to the "Ruth Ocumarez Award". Prior to the coronation night, a Venezuelan journalist Julio Matute Rodríguez wrote that Habach was arrogant and spoiled due to an affluent upbringing. It was also rumored that her family influenced the judges at the Miss Venezuela 2015 pageant.

Furthermore, several social media fonts speculated that her failure to enter the top 13 selection was due to allegedly disrespecting several candidates. There were televised segments where she pinched second runner-up Andrea Tovar of Colombia and stepped on semi-finalist Valeria Piazza of Peru, among other candidates' dresses without issuing remorse or apology. In later months, Habach gained further notoriety for a video mocking former first runner-up Ariadna Gutierrez of Colombia, in a recorded video prank allegedly referring to the provincial nature of Colombians.

Alongside her, other Venezuelan delegates who we're sent to the Miss World and Miss International beauty pageant during the year 2016 was unplaced, only Stephanie de Zorzi who was only the Venezuelan delegate (she was sent to Miss Earth 2016 Katherine Espín of Ecuador won the pageant) and she placed Miss Earth-Water (or the second runner-up (third place) position). She (Stephanie de Zorzi) was Venezuela's highest placement achiever during the year 2016.

== See also ==
- Miss Venezuela 2015

Awards and achievements
| Preceded by Mariana Jiménez | Miss Venezuela; 2015 | Succeeded by Keysi Sayago |
| Preceded by Julibell Alvarado | Miss Lara; 2015 | Succeeded by Elizabeth Sargo |
