= Zahra Burton =

Jamaican journalist

- Born: Zahra Burton; Kingston, Jamaica
- Education: Florida International University; University of Southern California
- Occupations: Journalist, broadcaster, reporter, CEO
- Beauty pageant titleholder
- Title: Miss Jamaica Universe 2001
- Hair color: Brown
- Eye color: Black
- Major competitions: Miss Jamaica Universe 2001 (Winner); Miss Universe 2001 (Unplaced)

Zahra Burton is a Jamaican journalist and beauty pageant titleholder who was crowned Miss Jamaica Universe 2001.

She is a former Bloomberg News reporter and is currently the host of the television news magazine 18 Degrees North that covers the Caribbean region.
