= Emily Maddison =

Jamaican model

- Born: Emily Sara-Claire Maddison; 1999 (age 26–27); Kingston, Jamaica
- Height: 1.73 m (5 ft 8 in)
- Beauty pageant titleholder
- Title: Miss Jamaica Universe 2018
- Hair color: Black
- Eye color: Brown
- Major competitions: Miss Jamaica Universe 2018 (Winner); Miss Universe 2018 (Top 20)

Emily Sara-Claire Maddison (born 1999) is a Jamaican model and beauty pageant titleholder who won Miss Jamaica Universe 2018. She represented Jamaica at the Miss Universe 2018 pageant.

== Personal life ==
Maddison was born and raised in Kingston, Jamaica. She attended Campion College.

== Pageantry ==
=== Miss Universe Jamaica 2018 ===
Maddison was crowned as Miss Universe Jamaica 2018 was held at the Jamaica Pegasus Hotel in Kingston, Jamaica on 24 August 2018. She succeeded outgoing Miss Universe Jamaica 2017 and Miss Universe 2017 2nd runner-up, Davina Bennett.

=== Miss Universe 2018 ===
Maddison represented Jamaica in Miss Universe 2018 held on 17 December 2018 in Bangkok, Thailand where she placed among the Top 20.

Awards and achievements
| Preceded by Davina Bennett | Miss Jamaica Universe; 2018 | Succeeded by Iana Tickle Garcia |
