= Kaci Fennell =

Jamaican TV host and model

Kaci Fennell-Shirley
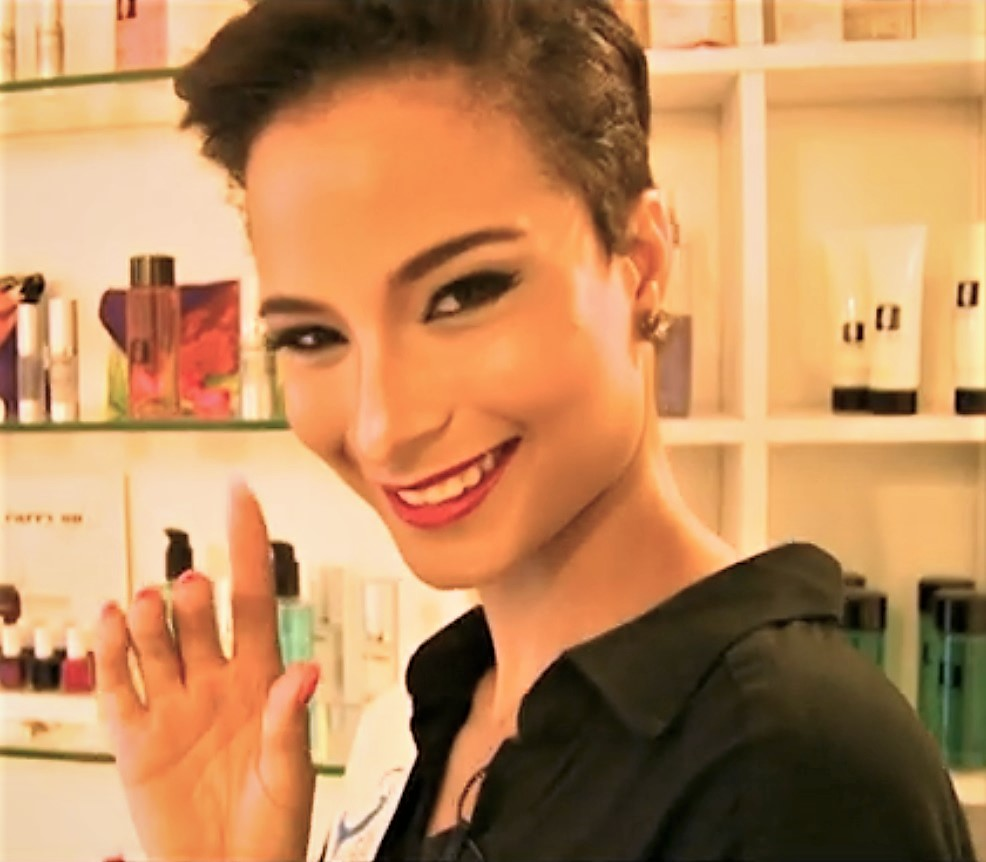
- Fennel on Reggae Entertainment Television in 2014
- Born: Kaci Fennell; 9 October 1992 (age 34); Kingston, Jamaica
- Height: 5 ft 9 in (1.75 m)
- Spouse: Zachary Shirley
- Beauty pageant titleholder
- Title: Miss Jamaica Universe 2014
- Hair color: Black
- Major competitions: Miss Jamaica Universe 2014 (Winner); Miss Universe 2014 (4th Runner Up)

Kaci Fennell-Shirley (born 9 October 1992) is a Jamaican of Afro-European heritage, model and beauty pageant titleholder who was crowned Miss Jamaica Universe 2014 and represented her country at the Miss Universe 2014 pageant.

== Pageantry ==
Fennell was crowned Miss Universe Jamaica 2014 and represented Sandcastles on 30 August 2014. She represented her country at Miss Universe 2014. Fennell placed as the 4th runner-up to Paulina Vega of Colombia. She was the first Miss Jamaica to place since 2010 and its second Top 5 placement after 2010.

== Modelling ==
Fennell is a model from Kingston, Jamaica. She won the Jamaica's Next Top Model contest.

Fennell has travelled to Cape Town, South Africa where she was with Base Model Agency. Fennell did a test shoot organised by INTUIT Concepts with photographer William Richards at the picturesque and fabulous Trident Castle in Portland, just days before leaving for South Africa. She is also on the cover of Nirvana Magazine 4th Edition dubbed "The Beauty Issue" making this her first ever, fashion magazine cover. For her shoot with Nirvana, Fennell's makeup artist was Romero Jennings, director of Makeup Artistry for MAC Cosmetics. She has also been featured in Buzz, SHE Caribbean, Profiles 98, The Jamaica Observer's Style Observer and the Jamaica Gleaner Flair and Outlook magazines.

Awards and achievements
Preceded by (Brazil) Jakelyne Oliveira	Miss Universe 4th Runner-Up; 2014	Succeeded by (Australia) Monika Radulovic (France) Flora Coquerel (Top 5)
Preceded by Kerrie Baylis	Miss Jamaica Universe; 2014	Succeeded by Sharlene Rädlein
