= Francesca Mifsud =

Maltese beauty pageant titleholder (born 1996)

- Born: Francesca Mifsud; July 19, 1996 (age 30); Żejtun, Malta
- Height: 1.76 m (5 ft 9 1/2 in)
- Beauty pageant titleholder
- Title: Miss Intercontinental Malta 2017; Miss Universe Malta 2018
- Hair color: Black
- Eye color: Brown
- Major competitions: Miss Intercontinental Malta 2017 (Winner); Miss Universe Malta 2018 (Winner) (Best Physique); Miss Universe 2018 (Unplaced)

Francesca Mifsud (born July 19, 1996) is a Maltese model and beauty pageant titleholder who won Miss Universe Malta 2018 on July 13, 2018. She represented Malta at Miss Universe 2018 pageant.

== Personal life ==
Mifsud lives in Zejtun, Malta. She is a law student at University of Malta and would like to pursue a career in criminal and civil law. In August 2016, Mifsud entered for the first time the Miss Universe Malta pageant where she finished in the Top 5 and awarded Miss Photo Model. In October of the same year, she won the contest Best Model of the World and represented Malta in Istanbul, Turkey where she won Best Face of the World. On July 13, 2018 Francesca represented her local council, Zejtun, and competed against 24 other contestants in a direct transmission on TVM. She won Miss Universe Malta and was awarded Best Physique.

== Achievements ==
- Miss Universe Malta 2018
- Miss Universe Malta 2018 Best Physique
- Best Model of the World 2016 Best Face
- Best Model of the World Malta 2016
- Best Model of the World Malta Miss Photogenic
- Miss Universe Malta 2016 3rd Runner Up
- Miss Universe 2016 Best Photo Model
- Represented Malta three times with the National Basketball team

Awards and achievements
Preceded by Tiffany Pisani	Miss Universe Malta; 2018	Succeeded by Teresa Ruglio
