= Lindita Idrizi =

Albanian model

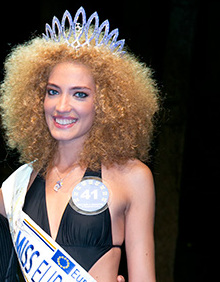
- Idrizi in 2015
- Born: 4 November 1996 (age 29); Elbasan, Albania
- Beauty pageant titleholder
- Title: Miss Universe Albania 2016
- Hair color: Blonde
- Eye color: Blue
- Major competitions: Miss Universe Albania 2016 (Winner); Miss Universe 2016 (Unplaced) (Miss Photogenic)

Lindita Idrizi (born 4 November 1996) is an Albanian model and beauty pageant titleholder who was crowned Miss Universe Albania 2016 and represented Albania at the Miss Universe 2016.

== Pageantry ==
=== Miss Europe Continental 2015 ===
Lindita Idrizi was selected as the 2015 winner of Miss Europe Continental, Italy's international beauty contest held on 5 September 2015 in Paestum, Italy.

=== Miss Universe Albania 2016 ===
Idrizi was crowned Miss Universe Albania 2016 and she represented Albania in the Miss Universe 2016.

=== Miss Universe 2016 ===
Idrizi represented Albania at Miss Universe 2016; she was awarded Miss Photogenic.
