= Iana Tickle Garcia =

Miss Jamaica Universe 2019, contestant in Miss Universe 2019

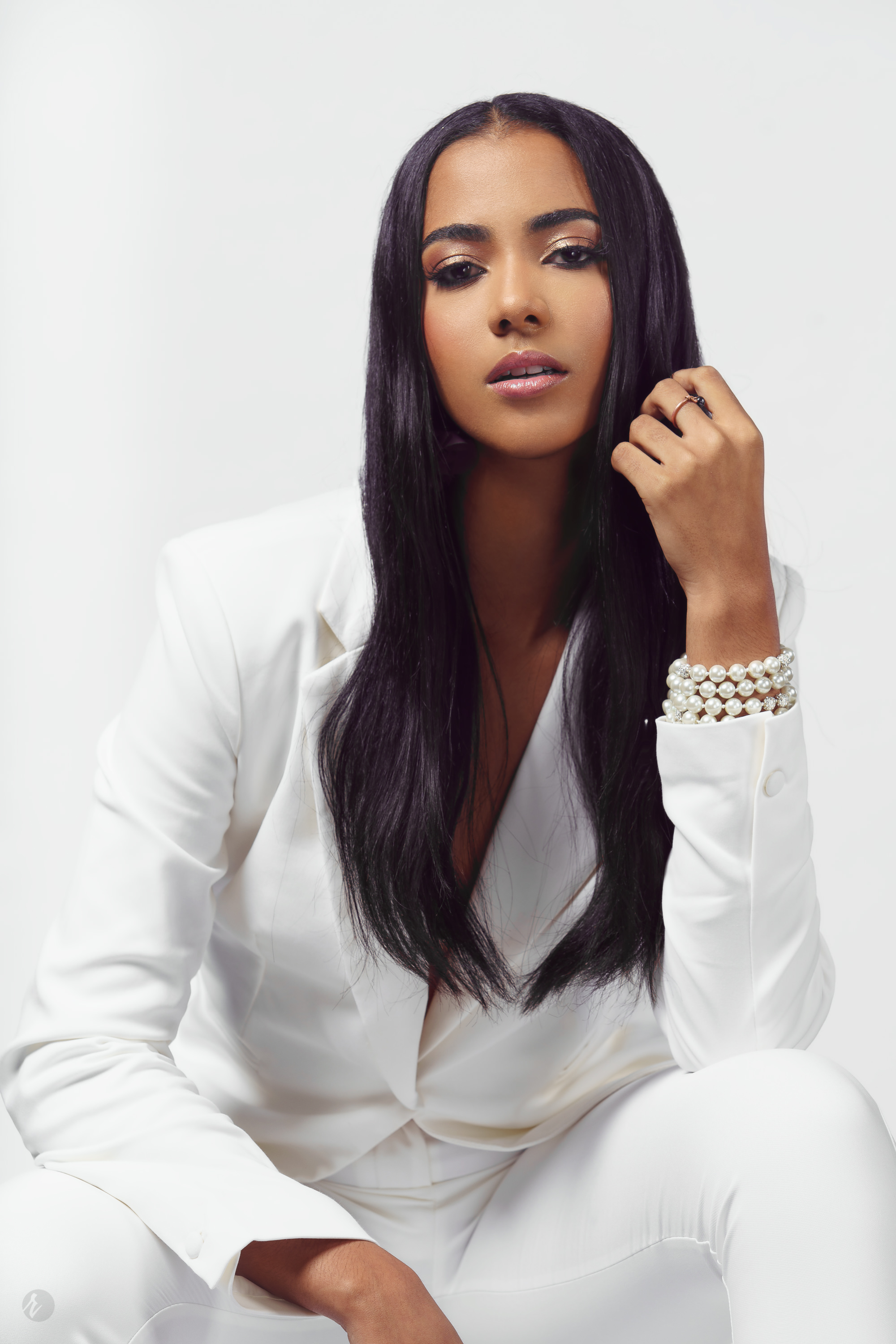
- Born: Iana Olivia Tickle Garcia; 7 May 2000 (age 26); Montego Bay, Jamaica
- Education: Montego Bay Community College
- Occupation: Model
- Height: 1.78 m (5 ft 10 in)
- Beauty pageant titleholder
- Title: Miss Universe Jamaica North-West 2019; Miss Universe Jamaica 2019
- Hair color: Brown
- Eye color: Brown
- Major competitions: Miss Jamaica Universe 2019 (Winner); Miss Universe 2019 (Unplaced)

Iana Olivia Tickle Garcia (born 7 May 2000) is a Jamaican model and beauty pageant titleholder who was crowned Miss Universe Jamaica 2019 on August 31 at the National Arena in Kingston. She represented her country, Jamaica, at the Miss Universe 2019 pageant which was held and aired live on Fox and Telemundo from the Tyler Perry Studios in Atlanta, GA on Sunday 8 December 2019 at 7p ET.

== Personal life ==
Iana Tickle Garcia was born and raised in Montego Bay in the parish of Saint James. She is of Anglo-German, Swiss, and Afro-Cuban descent by way of her father and mother respectively. She has a younger brother. She attended the Mt Alvernia High School, and then the Montego Bay Community College. She has been accepted to the University of the West Indies to study International Relations and Law. She operates her own charity called Crochet for Charity which positions her to be one of the most altruistic Jamaican titleholders. Tickle Garcia is a brown sash in Kung-fu which she has practiced since the age of 12 and has completed the 7th Grade of the ABRSM Piano exam.

== Pageantry ==
Iana began her pageantry career in the Miss Montego Bay pageant in 2018 where she was the first runner up. She then went on to participate in Miss Universe Jamaica North West, where she was crowned Miss Universe Jamaica North West 2019. Because of this title, she became an automatic finalist in the Miss Jamaica Universe 2019 competition which took place on August 31, 2019, where she was crowned as Miss Universe Jamaica 2019. She was crowned by outgoing titleholder Emily Maddison. As Miss Jamaica Universe, Iana represented Jamaica at the Miss Universe 2019 pageant, but failed to place in the Top 20.

Awards and achievements
Preceded by Emily Maddison	Miss Jamaica Universe; 2019	Succeeded by Miqueal-Symone Williams
