= Miss Universe 2016 =

65th edition of the Miss Universe competition

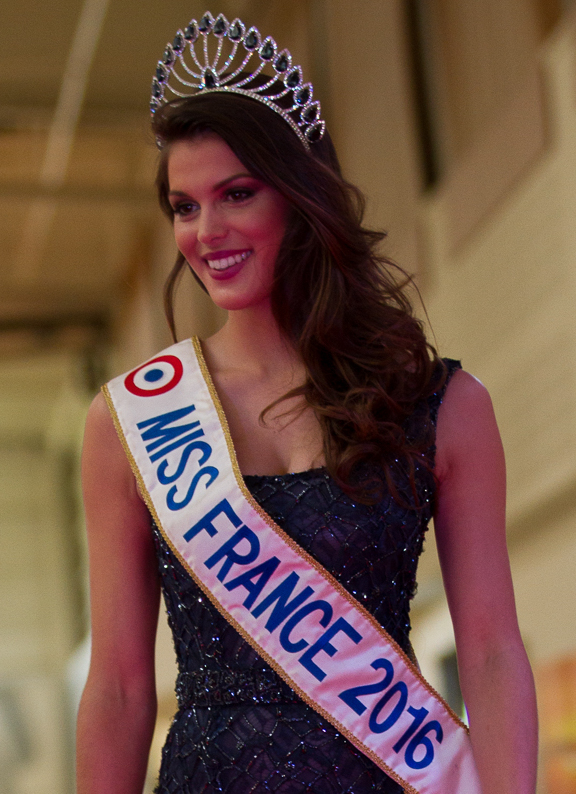
- Iris Mittenaere
- Date: January 30, 2017
- Presenters: Steve Harvey; Ashley Graham
- Entertainment: Flo Rida; Boyz II Men
- Venue: SM Mall of Asia Arena, Pasay, Metro Manila, Philippines
- Broadcaster: International: Fox; Azteca; Official broadcaster: Solar Entertainment; ABS-CBN; GMA Network; TV5
- Entrants: 86
- Placements: 13
- Debuts: Sierra Leone
- Withdrawals: El Salvador; Gabon; Ghana; Greece; Ireland; Lebanon; Montenegro; Serbia
- Returns: Barbados; Belize; Guam; Iceland; Kazakhstan; Kenya; Malta; Namibia; Romania; Slovenia; Sri Lanka; Switzerland; United States Virgin Islands
- Winner: Iris Mittenaere; France
- Congeniality: Jenny Kim, South Korea
- Best National Costume: Htet Htet Htun, Myanmar
- Photogenic: Lindita Idrizi, Albania

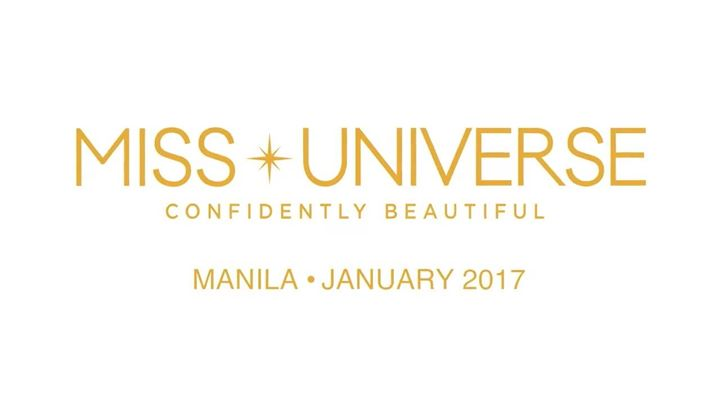
The pageant logo

Miss Universe 2016 was the 65th Miss Universe pageant, held at the SM Mall of Asia Arena, in Pasay, Metro Manila, Philippines, on January 30, 2017. This was the second time that the pageant skipped a year, after Miss Universe 2014 was held in January 2015.

At the conclusion of the event, the winner, Iris Mittenaere of France was crowned Miss Universe 2016 by the previous winner, Pia Wurtzbach of the Philippines. And it was France's first win in sixty-three years, and its second overall win. The first and second runners-up we're Haiti's Raquel Pélissier and Colombia's Andrea Tovar.

Contestants from eighty-six countries and territories competed in the pageant. Steve Harvey was the host, and plus-sized model Ashley Graham was the backstage host. American entertainers Flo Rida and Boyz II Men were the acts.

== Background ==
SM Mall of Asia Arena, the pageant venue

=== Location and date ===
It was announced November 3, 2016, that the Philippines would host the pageant, at the SM Mall of Asia Arena in Pasay on January 30, 2017. The collaboration agreement to that effect was signed on November 16.

=== Host and performers ===
On November 3, 2016, the Miss Universe Organization confirmed that Steve Harvey would host the pageant, continuing his five-year contract with Miss Universe. On December 15, 2016, plus-sized model Ashley Graham confirmed that she would be the backstage host. On January 19, 2017, rapper Flo Rida was announced as a guest performer.

=== Selection of participants ===
Contestants from eighty-six countries and territories were selected to compete in the pageant. Eight of these delegates were appointees to their titles after being a runner-up of their national pageant or an audition process or other internal selection, while four were selected to replace the original dethroned winner.

Stephanie Geldhof, the first runner-up of Miss Belgium 2016, was appointed to represent Belgium after the original winner, Lenty Frans, decided to compete at Miss World 2016 due to conflicting schedules with Miss Belgium 2017. Jenny Kim, the first runner-up of Miss World Korea 2015, was appointed by the Miss Universe Korea Organization after the Miss Korea organization lost the franchise. Kushboo Ramnawaj was appointed by the Miss Estrella Mauritius Organization after the Miss Mauritius organization relinquished the franchise. Yuliana Korolkova, the first runner-up of Miss Russia 2016, was appointed as Miss Universe Russia 2016 after Yana Dobrovolskaya, Miss Russia 2016, decided to compete at Miss World 2016 due to the conflicting schedules of the two pageants.

Paula Schneider, Miss Bolivia 2015, was to represent Bolivia, but resigned for personal reasons. Antonella Moscatelli, Miss Bolivia 2016, was appointed instead. Regina Valter, Miss Universe Kazakhstan 2015, was to compete in Miss Universe 2016 after her withdrawal in 2015. However, Valter was disqualified after getting married. Darina Kulsitova, Miss Universe Kazakhstan 2016, replaced her. Brenda Jiménez, first runner-up of Miss Universe Puerto Rico 2016, was crowned the new Miss Universe Puerto Rico 2016, after Kristhielee Caride, the original winner, was dethroned due to her behaviour. Đặng Thị Lệ Hằng, the second runner-up of Miss Universe Vietnam 2015, was appointed as the representative of Vietnam to Miss Universe after Ngô Trà My, the first runner-up, refused to compete and got married.

The 2016 edition saw the debut of Sierra Leone and the returns of Barbados, Belize, Guam, Iceland, Kazakhstan, Kenya, Malta, Namibia, Romania, Slovenia, Sri Lanka, Switzerland, and the United States Virgin Islands. Malta last competed in 2001, Barbados and Belize last competed in 2007, Iceland last competed in 2009, US Virgin Islands last competed in 2011, Namibia and Romania last competed in 2013, while the others last competed in 2014. El Salvador, Gabon, Ghana, Greece, Ireland, Lebanon, Montenegro, and Serbia withdrew. Adela Zoranic of Montenegro and Bojana Bojanic of Serbia withdrew from the competition for unknown reasons. El Salvador, Gabon, Ghana, Greece, Ireland, and Lebanon withdrew after their respective organizations failed to hold a national competition or appoint a delegate.

== Results ==
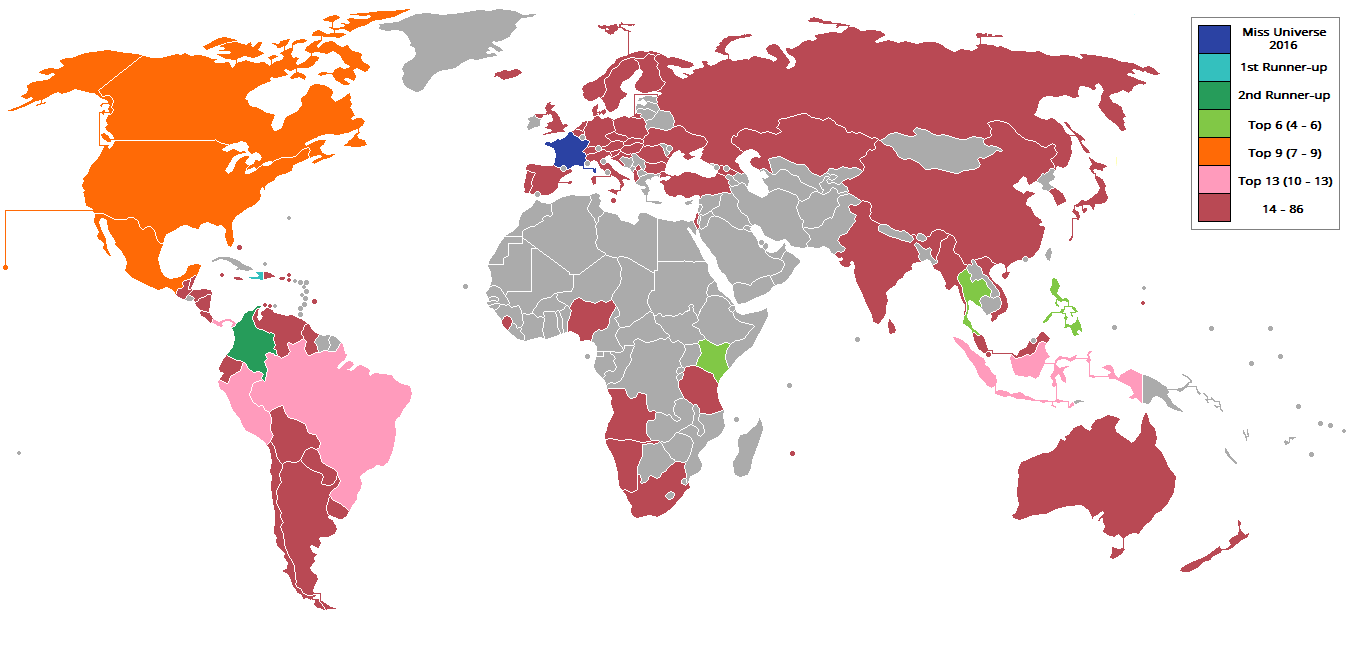
Miss Universe 2016 participating countries and territories.

=== Placements ===
Placement	Contestant
Miss Universe 2016	France – Iris Mittenaere
1st Runner-Up	Haiti – Raquel Pélissier
2nd Runner-Up	Colombia – Andrea Tovar
Top 6	Kenya – Mary Esther Were; Philippines – Maxine Medina; Thailand – Chalita Suansane §
Top 9	Canada – Siera Bearchell; Mexico – Kristal Silva; United States – Deshauna Barber
Top 13	Brazil – Raissa Santana; Indonesia – Kezia Warouw; Panama – Keity Drennan; Peru – Valeria Piazza

§ – Voted in the Top 13 by viewers

=== Special awards ===
==== Major awards ====
Awards	Contestant
Miss Congeniality	South Korea – Jenny Kim
Miss Photogenic	Albania – Lindita Idrizi
Best National Costume	Myanmar – Htet Htet Htun
Fan Vote Winner	Thailand - Chalita Suansane

==== Minor/Sponsor awards ====
Awards	Contestant
Flawless of the Universe	Venezuela – Mariam Habach
Miss Phoenix	Venezuela – Mariam Habach
Miss Phoenix Smile	Indonesia – Kezia Warouw
Hiyas ng Phoenix	Philippines – Maxine Medina

== Pageant ==
=== Format ===
The Miss Universe Organization introduced several specific changes to the format for this edition. The number of semifinalists was reduced to thirteen— the lowest since 2002. The results of the preliminary competition— which consisted of the swimsuit and evening gown competition, and the closed-door interview, determined the twelve semifinalists. Internet voting returned, with fans being able to vote for another delegate to advance into the semifinals, making the number of semifinalists thirteen. The thirteen semifinalists participated in the swimsuit competition, with nine advancing in the competition for the evening gown competition. Six finalists advanced to participate in the question and answer portion, while three finalists advanced to participate in the final question and the final walk.

=== Selection committee ===
- Cynthia Bailey – model, television personality and actress
- Mickey Boardman – editorial director and advice columnist for Paper magazine
- Francine LeFrak – activist and founder of Same Sky and support foundation for people living with HIV
- Leila Lopes – Miss Universe 2011 from Angola
- Sushmita Sen – Miss Universe 1994 from India
- Dayanara Torres – Miss Universe 1993 from Puerto Rico

== Contestants ==
Eighty-six contestants competed for the title.

Country/Territory	Contestant	Age (Note: Ages at the time of the pageant)	Hometown
Albania	Lindita Idrizi	20	Elbasan
Angola	Luísa Baptista	21	Cuando Cubango
Argentina	Estefanía Bernal	21	Buenos Aires
Aruba	Charlene Leslie	24	Oranjestad
Australia	Caris Tiivel	23	Perth
Austria	Dajana Dzinic	21	Vienna
(The Bahamas) Bahamas	Cherell Williamson	24	Nassau
Barbados	Shannon Harris	22	Bridgetown
Belgium	Stephanie Geldhof	19	Aalst
Belize	Rebecca Rath	23	Dangriga
Bolivia	Antonella Moscatelli	21	Santa Cruz
Brazil	Raissa Santana	21	Umuarama
British Virgin Islands	Erika Creque	22	Road Town
Bulgaria	Violina Ancheva	21	Sofia
Canada	Siera Bearchell	23	Moose Jaw
Cayman Islands	Monyque Brooks	25	West Bay
Chile	Catalina Cáceres	26	Santiago
China	Li Zhenying	21	Shanghai
Colombia	Andrea Tovar	23	Quibdó
Costa Rica	Carolina Rodríguez	27	Alajuela
Croatia	Barbara Filipović	19	Zagreb
Curaçao	Chanelle de Lau	21	Willemstad
Czech Republic	Andrea Bezděková	21	Prague
Denmark	Christina Mikkelsen	24	Copenhagen
Dominican Republic	Rosalba García	24	Maimón
Ecuador	Connie Jiménez	21	Ventanas
Finland	Shirly Karvinen	24	Helsinki
France	Iris Mittenaere	23	Lille
(Georgia (country)) Georgia	Nuka Karalashvili	25	Tbilisi
Germany	Johanna Acs	24	Eschweiler
(United Kingdom) Great Britain	Jaime-Lee Faulkner	27	Sheffield
Guam	Muñeka Taisipic	19	Yona
Guatemala	Virginia Argueta	22	Jutiapa
Guyana	Soyini Fraser	26	Georgetown
Haiti	Raquel Pélissier	25	Port-au-Prince
Honduras	Sirey Moran	26	El Progreso
Hungary	Veronika Bodizs	24	Budapest
Iceland	Hildur María Leifsdóttir	24	Kópavogur
India	Roshmitha Harimurthy	22	Bengaluru
Indonesia	Kezia Warouw	25	Manado
Israel	Yam Kaspers Anshel	19	Herzliya
Italy	Sophia Sergio	24	Naples
Jamaica	Isabel Dalley	20	Montego Bay
Japan	Sari Nakazawa	23	Shiga
Kazakhstan	Darina Kulsitova	19	Semey
Kenya	Mary Esther Were	27	Nairobi
Kosovo	Camila Barraza	23	Pristina
Malaysia	Kiran Jassal	20	Subang Jaya
Malta	Martha Fenech	27	St. Julian's
Mauritius	Kushboo Ramnawaj	26	Rivière Du Poste
Mexico	Kristal Silva	25	Ciudad Victoria
Myanmar	Htet Htet Htun	24	Yangon
Namibia	Lizelle Esterhuizen	20	Windhoek
Netherlands	Zoey Ivory	23	Almere
New Zealand	Tania Dawson	24	Auckland
Nicaragua	Marina Jacoby	21	Matagalpa
Nigeria	Unoaku Anyadike	22	Lagos
Norway	Christina Waage	21	Nes
Panama	Keity Drennan	26	Panama City
Paraguay	Andrea Melgarejo	22	Villarrica
Peru	Valeria Piazza	26	Lima
Philippines	Maxine Medina	26	Quezon City
Poland	Izabella Krzan	21	Olsztyn
Portugal	Flávia Brito	23	Vilamoura
Puerto Rico	Brenda Jiménez	22	Aguadilla
Romania	Teodora Dan	27	Bucharest
Russia	Yuliana Korolkova	22	Orsk
Sierra Leone	Hawa Kamara	26	Freetown
Singapore	Cheryl Chou	20	Singapore
Slovakia	Zuzana Kollárová	25	Bratislava
Slovenia	Lucija Potočnik	25	Maribor
South Africa	Ntandoyenkosi Kunene	24	Mkhondo
South Korea	Jenny Kim	23	Seoul
Spain	Noelia Freire	24	Ciudad Real
Sri Lanka	Jayathi De Silva	26	Colombo
Sweden	Ida Ovmar	21	Luleå
Switzerland	Dijana Cvijetić	23	Gossau
Tanzania	Jihan Dimack	20	Dar es Salaam
Thailand	Chalita Suansane	22	Samut Prakan
Turkey	Tansu Sila Çakir	21	Istanbul
Ukraine	Alena Spodynyuk	19	Kyiv
United States	Deshauna Barber	27	Washington, D.C.
United States Virgin Islands	Carolyn Carter	27	Saint Croix
Uruguay	Magdalena Cohendet	22	Artigas
Venezuela	Mariam Habach	21	El Tocuyo
Vietnam	Lệ Hằng Đặng	23	Đà Nẵng
