= Chantal Zaky =

- Born: Chantal Zaky; 12 February 1988 (age 38); New York City, U.S.
- Height: 1.77 m (5 ft 9 1/2 in)
- Beauty pageant titleholder
- Title: Miss Jamaica Universe 2012
- Hair color: Black
- Eye color: Brown
- Major competitions: Miss Tourism Queen Jamaica 2011; Miss Jamaica Universe 2011 (2nd Runner-Up); Miss Jamaica Universe 2012 (Winner) (Best Beach Body); Miss Universe 2012 (Unplaced)

Chantal Zaky (born 1988) is a Jamaican-American model and beauty pageant titleholder who was crowned Miss Jamaica Universe 2012 and represented Jamaica at the Miss Universe 2012 pageant.

== Early life ==
She supports charities such as, the Jamaican Cancer Society, and is the founder of Sunshine Youth, a non-profit organization dedicated to Youth Education and Empowerment through creative expression and sportsmanship. She is an Ambassador for the Governor General of Jamaica's I Believe Initiative.

, spokesperson and ambassador for various international projects. Chantal has been spotted walking down the runways of international fashion shows for High Fashion Brands . She has modeled in collaboration with Miss Universe,

She has appeared in and graced the covers in many publications such as Ocean Style Magazine,

== Pageants ==
=== Miss Jamaica Universe 2012 ===
Zaky was crowned Miss Jamaica Universe 2012 by Miss Jamaica Universe 2011 Shakira Martin in the presence of Leila Lopes, reigning Miss Universe 2011, at the National Indoor Sports Center in Kingston on May 12, 2012.

As part of her duties, she par-took in motivational speaking events for young women where she stressed the dangers of peer-pressure and importance of believing in yourself and the power of Positive Thinking.

As Miss Universe Jamaica she traveled locally and internationally, as a humanitarian and environmentalist promoting the prevention of HIV/AIDS Breast Cancer Awareness, Youth Empowerment and the Natural Beauty of Jamaica.

She's met with political, social leaders and Media Personalities. She appeared in several TV, Radio and public events during her reign.

=== Miss Universe 2012 ===
Zaky represented Jamaica at the 61st Miss Universe pageant on December 19, 2012, in Las Vegas, Nevada, USA where she vied to succeed out going titleholder Leila Lopes of Angola, but failed to place in the semifinals.

Awards and achievements
Preceded by Shakira Martin	Miss Jamaica Universe; 2012	Succeeded by Kerrie Baylis
