= Miss Universe Belize =

National beauty pageant competition in Belize

- Type: Beauty pageant
- Headquarters: Belize City
- Location: Belize
- Members: Miss Universe
- Official language: English
- President: Destinee Arnold

Miss Universe Belize is a national Beauty pageant that selects Belize's official representative to Miss Universe.

== History ==
In the early days of Miss Universe Belize (then known as Miss Belize), one pageant was held yearly to select a representative for the Miss Universe pageant, with either the winner or a runner-up representing Belize at Miss World. Recently, there has been an emergence of different pageants to select representatives for different international pageants as opposed to just one pageant with several winners.

=== 2008 ===
Miss Universe Belize 2008 Tanisha Vernon spoke out against "Pageants Belize, owner, and only employee – Margaret Johnson". Her crown was then revoked in July 2008.

=== 2016 ===
In 2016, Opal Enriquez took over the Miss Belize franchise.

=== 2018—2022 ===
In 2018, Romeo Escobar, a three-time Emmy award-winning producer took over the franchise of Miss Universe in Belize. He left the franchise in 2023, citing disagreements with the Miss Universe Organization owners over how franchises should run.

=== 2023—Present ===
In 2023, Miss Universe Belize 2019, Destinee Arnold took over the Miss Belize franchise. The pageant was renamed to "Miss Universe Belize". The franchise is currently under the House of Crowns by Team Destination organization.

== Titleholders ==
- : Declared as Winner
- : Ended as runner-up or top 5/6 qualification
- : Ended as one of the finalists or semifinalists
- : Ended as special awards winner

Year	Miss Belize	Placement at Miss Universe	Special Award(s)	Notes
2026	Caleigh-Rose West	TBA	TBA	Destiny Wagner directorship.
2025	Isabella Zabaneh	Unplaced		
2024	Halima Hoy	Unplaced		Destinee Arnold directorship.
2023	Did not compete			
2022	Ashley Lightburn	Unplaced		
2021	Did not compete			
2020	Iris Salguero	Unplaced		
2019	Destinee Arnold	Unplaced		
2018	Jenelli Fraser	Unplaced		Romeo Escobar directorship.
2017	Did not compete			
2016	Rebecca Rath	Unplaced	Best National Costume (Top 12)	Opal Onriquez directorship.
Did not compete between 2010—2015
2009	Charmaine Chinapen	Did not compete		Withdrawal — Charmaine allocated to Miss World 2008.
2008	Tanisha Vernon	Did not compete		Failed to sign her contract and that she could not expect to continue as queen "Miss Belize".
2007	Maria Jeffery	Unplaced		
2006	Did not compete			
2005	Andrea Elrington	Unplaced		
2004	Leilah Anne Magdalena Pandy	Unplaced		
2003	Becky Belinda Bernard	Unplaced		Margaret Johnson directorship.
2002	Karen Anita Russell	Did not compete		Carolyn Trench-Sandiford directorship.
2001	Did not compete			
2000	Shiemicka Richardson	Unplaced		
1999	Viola Jeffery	Unplaced		
1998	Elvia Lilia Vega	Unplaced		
1997	Sharon Domínguez	Unplaced		
1996	Ava Lovell	Unplaced		
1995	Deborah Wade	Unplaced		
1994	Did not compete			
1993	Melanie Smith	Unplaced		
1992	Did not compete			
1991	Josephine Gault	Unplaced		
1990	Ysela Antonia Zabaneh	Unplaced		
1989	Andrea Shermane McKoy	Unplaced		
1988	Did not compete			
1987	Holly Emma Edgell	Unplaced		Solie Arguelles (Pageants Belize) directorship.
1986	Romy Ellen Taegar	Unplaced		
1985	Jennifer (Jenny) Woods	Unplaced		
1984	Lisa Patricia Ramírez	Unplaced		
1983	Shirlene Dianne McKoy	Unplaced		
1982	Sharon Kay Auxillou	Unplaced		
1981	Ivette Zabaneh	Unplaced		
1980	Ellen Marie Clarke	Unplaced		
1979	Sarita Diana Acosta	Top 12		
1978	Christina Margarita Ysaguirre	Unplaced		
1977	Dora Maria Phillips	Unplaced		
1976	Janet Joan Joseph	Unplaced		
1975	Pelisamay Longsworth	Unplaced		Under the UDP Minister Youth and Culture of Belize.
