= Shakira Martin (model) =

Jamaican model (1986–2016)

- Born: June 1, 1986; Brooklyn, New York, U.S.
- Died: August 3, 2016 (aged 30); Fort Lauderdale, Florida, U.S.
- Education: Broward College
- Occupation: Model
- Height: 5 ft 8 in (1.73 m)
- Beauty pageant titleholder
- Title: Miss Jamaica Universe 2011
- Hair color: Black
- Eye color: Brown
- Major competitions: Miss Jamaica Universe 2011 (Winner); Miss Universe 2011 (Unplaced)
- Known for: Miss Jamaica Universe 2011

Shakira Martin (June 1, 1986 – August 3, 2016) was a Jamaican model and beauty pageant titleholder who was crowned Miss Jamaica Universe 2011 and represented Jamaica at Miss Universe 2011 in Brazil on September 12, 2011.

== Early life and career ==
Martin was born on June 1, 1986, in Brooklyn, New York. Her family relocated to South Florida in 1989, but would visit her mother's homeland of Jamaica frequently. She was a student of Nova High School and graduated in 2004. She then attended Broward College. Before becoming a model, Martin was a pre-school teacher. Martin competed in a pageant in Miami and came in second. A friend of Martin's convinced her to compete in Miss Jamaica Universe. Martin won the title of Miss Jamaica Universe in 2011 and used her crown as a platform to raise awareness for people affected by sickle cell anemia. in 2011, Martin was a part of a toy drive that donated 400 toys to ill children in a Jamaican hospital. She had modeled in countries such as Jamaica, Brazil, Canada and Haiti.

Martin was diagnosed with sickle cell anemia at 3 months old. Both of Martin's parents had the trait for the disease and thus had a 25 percent chance of giving it to a child. Her brother is also a carrier of the trait.

== Death ==
According to Martin's mother, Martin wasn't feeling well after a trip to Jamaica. She died at 12:28 a.m. from complications with sickle cell blood clots in both her lungs. She was 30 years old.

Awards and achievements
Preceded by Yendi Phillips	Miss Jamaica Universe; 2011	Succeeded by Chantal Zaky
