= Miss Malta =

National beauty pageant in Malta

- Formation: 1963
- Founder: George and Margaret Gatt Mangion
- Type: Beauty pageant
- Headquarters: Valletta
- Location: Malta
- Members: Miss Earth; Miss Grand International; Miss Supranational; Miss Cosmo
- Official language: Maltese
- President: Kersten Borg
- Website: missmalta.tv

Miss Malta is a national beauty pageant in Malta which was founded in 1963 by George and Margaret Gatt Mangion of GM Productions. The pageant is also considered as the oldest beauty contest held in the Maltese Islands. During 2014 – 2018, the event was organized by Glamorous Entertainment (Glow Promotions), under the management of Vince Taliana. Since 2019, the pageant has been run under the leadership of Kersten Borg.

The reigning Miss Malta is Kim Pelham of St. Julian's who was crowned on 7 November 2021 at the Radisson Blue hotel of Għajn Tuffieħa.

== Titleholders ==
Year	Miss Malta	Runners-up				Ref.
Year	Miss Malta	1st Runner-up (Miss Republic of Malta)	2nd Runner-up (Miss Tourism Malta)	3rd Runner-up (Miss Grand Malta)	4th Runner-up (Top Model Malta)	Ref.
2003	Mellieħa – Dana Ben Moussa	Birkirkara – Nerrisa Mifsud Camilleri	No data available	—N/a		
2013	Fleur-de-Lys – Jade Cini	Sliema – Natalya Galdes	Żurrieq – Mandy Micallef	—N/a		
2014	St. Julian's – Pearl Haber	Ħamrun – Maria Abela	Birkirkara – Rodianne Gatt	—N/a		
2015	Balzan – Sarah Mercieca	Gżira – Nicola Grixti	St. Paul's Bay – Louisa Abela	—N/a		
2016	Luqa – Christie Refalo	Valletta – Bernadette Bajada	Santa Venera – Maria Abela	—N/a		
2017	St. Paul's Bay – Yanika Azzopardi	Naxxar – Jessica Gherxi	Lija – Naomi Hammett	—N/a		
2018	Tarxien – Alexia Pauline Tabone	San Pawl il-Baħar – Yaz Abughrara	Attard – Nicole Agius	—N/a		
2020	St. Julian's – Hannah Giacchino	Attard – Nicole Agius	Qrendi – Amanda Bezzina	—N/a		
2021	St. Julian's – Kim Pelham	(Pembroke, Malta) Pembroke – Leah Sammut Mock	(Swieqi) Madliena – Shannah Vella Rapa	San Ġwann – Isabelle Borg	(St. Paul's Bay) Xemxija – Kristy Falzon	
2023	Sliema – Anne Camilleri	Jade Schembri	Laura Buijs	Kylie Marie Micallef	Donna Borg	
2024	Kalkara – Cherise Spiteri	Dingli – Lexine Farrugia	Żurrieq – Alexia Cutajar	(Swieqi) Madliena – Yasemin Ertugrull	(St. Paul's Bay) Xemxija – Karolina Bordian	

Notes
2. In the 2010 – 2020 edition, the runners-up was announced as Miss Republic of Malta and Miss Tourism of Malta
2. In the 2021 edition, the second to the fifth place was sequentially announced as Miss Republic of Malta, Miss Tourism of Malta, Miss Grand Malta, and Top Model Malta.

== International competition ==
From 1965 to 2001, the winner of Miss Malta represented the country at the Miss World pageant. However, a new organization, Miss World Malta, had instead launched in 2002 to send its delegates to such the international pageant.

Miss Malta titleholders at International beauty pageants
Year	Representative	District	National tiltle	International pageant	Ref.
2013	Jade Cini	Fleur-de-Lys	Miss Malta 2013	Miss Intercontinental 2013 – Unplaced	
2014	Pearl Haber	St. Julian's	Miss Malta 2014	Miss Intercontinental 2014 – Unplaced	
2015	Sarah Mercieca	Balzan	Miss Malta 2015	Miss Grand International 2015 – Unplaced	
2015	Nicola Grixti	Gżira	1st runner-up Miss Malta 2015	Miss Supranational 2015 – Unplaced	
2017	Christie Refalo	Luqa	Miss Malta 2016	Miss Earth 2017 – Unplaced	
2018	Yanika Azzopardi	St. Paul's Bay	Miss Malta 2017	Miss Earth 2018 – Unplaced	
2019	Alexia Tabone	Tarxien	Miss Malta 2018	Miss Earth 2019 – Unplaced	

== See also ==
- Miss Malta Universe
- Miss World Malta
- Miss Grand Malta
