= Listed Miss Grand International 2018's national representative selection =

Miss Grand International 2018's national preliminary pageants

MGI 2018 Participants classified by selection methods:
1. A1: Miss Grand National pageant winners: 15 (20.0%)
2. A2: Other 2023 national pageant main winners: 2 (2.67%)
3. B1: Won Miss Grand as supplemental title: 14 (18.7%)
4. B2: Appointed from other 2023 pageants: 13 (17.3%)
5. C1: Casting/audition: 1 (1.33%)
6. C2: Appointed, no pageant held: 30 (40.0%)

The 6th edition of the Miss Grand International pageant was held at the One Entertainment Park in Yangon, Myanmar on October 25, 2018, in which candidates from 75 countries and territories participated. These candidates were elected as the country representatives through different methods, such as through the Miss Grand National which was held to select the country representative for Miss Grand International specifically, or appointed by another national pageant organizer, in which the main winner was sent to compete on other international stages. Some of them were assigned as representatives without competing at any national pageant in this particular year.

== Overview ==
As per data collected in the National preliminary contest section, 44 national pageant was held to elect the country representatives for Miss Grand International 2018. 19 of which was the Miss Grand National (A1), while 2 was other national contests that sent their main winners to Miss Grand International 2023 (A2), 14 national contest listed the Miss Grand title as one of the supplement awards (B1), while the remaining 13 contest later appointed its runner-up as Miss Grand National titleholder (B2). All the remaining candidates were either determined through the casting or appointed without participating in any respective national pageants (C1 and C2), such as the representative of Panama.

This year, the Miss Grand National was also held in Azerbaijan, but the organizer, Elxan Pashayev, did not hold the license of Miss Grand International for Azerbaijan.

Three candidates, who were elected as the country representatives through the national pageant, did not enter the international tournament for different reasons, and no replacements were assigned, including the representatives of Bahamas, Namibia, and Singapore.

The representatives of Guatemala and Honduras were also appointed but did not compete for undisclosed reasons, while the representative of Lithuania, Jurate Stasiunaite, withdrew during the international pageant camp for personal reasons.

Five replacements have been observed, including:

- Albania: The Miss Grand Albania 2018 winner, Dashuria Bilaj, was replaced by an appointed, Klaudia Kalia, after Lens Production lost the franchise to Aleks Fashion Events.
- Canada: The Miss Grand Canada 2018 winner, Veronica Rodriguez, was replaced by the runner-up, Grace Diamani, for undisclosed reasons.
- Colombia: Génesis Quintero, the original Miss Grand Colombia 2018, resigned from the title, and Sheyla Quizena was appointed as the replacement.
- Kosovo: After several conflicts with the national director, the Miss Grand Kosovo 2018 winner, Bernadeta Nikolla, resigned from the title, and Songyl Meniqi was appointed as the replacement.
- Spain: Mariola Angulo, Miss Grand Spain 2018 winner, resigned from the title for undisclosed reasons, then the first runner-up, Patricia López, was promoted to take over the title and competed internationally as the replacement.

In this edition, a total of 13 countries withdrew, 3 countries debuted, and 10 countries returned, making the total 75 countries that participated. The information is summarized below.

Returns
Withdrawals
Debuts
- Last competed in 2013:
  - El Salvador
- Last competed in 2014:
  - Kazakhstan
  - Kosovo
- Last competed in 2015:
  - Albania
  - Ghana
- Last competed in 2016:
  - Moldova
  - Norway
  - Poland
  - Suriname
  - Taiwan
- No licensee:
  - Belarus
  - Egypt
  - Fiji
  - France
  - Hungary
  - Northern Ireland
  - Lithuania
  - Nicaragua
  - Nigeria
  - Serbia
  - Slovakia
  - South Sudan
  - Uganda
- Representative determined
  but did not compete:
  - Azerbaijan
  - Bahamas
  - Guatemala
  - Honduras
  - Namibia
  - Singapore
- Withdrew during the pageant
  - Lithuania
- Cape Verde
- Cook Islands
- Zambia

== National preliminary contest ==
The following is a list of Miss Grand International 2018's national preliminary contests, which were categorized by the country representative selection methods.

Map shows Miss Grand International 2018 participating countries and territories, classified by representative selection methods (as of May 2023)
Color keys
A1: Main winner of the Miss Grand National pageant, e.g., Miss Grand Spain of Spain.
A2: Main winner of the national contest with other pageant names apart from Miss Grand, e.g., Nuestra Belleza Puerto Rico of Puerto Rico.
B1: Obtained Miss Grand National as the supplementary title at other national pageants, e.g., the representative from Miss World Canada of Canada.
B2: Appointed Miss Grand National after (1) obtaining any other supplementary positions at other national pageants in 2023 or (2) finishing other placements other than the main winner at the previous Miss Grand National edition.
C1: Determined through the casting or audition processes.
C2: Appointed with no pageant held
D0: Did not participate/ to be determined

List of the national preliminary pageants (A1 – B2) for the Miss Grand International 2018 contest, by the coronation date
Country/Territory	Pageant	Type	Date and Venue	Entrants	Ref.
Total: 45 pageants		–			–
Czech Republic	Miss Face	B2	September 30, 2017, at the Forum Karlín, Prague	10	
Myanmar	Miss Universe Myanmar	B2	September 30, 2017, at the Gandamar Grand Ballroom, Gandamar Wholesale	30	
Peru	Miss Peru	B2	October 29, 2017, at the Municipal Theatre, Lima	23	
Venezuela	Miss Venezuela	B2	November 9, 2017, at the Venevisión - Studio 5, Caracas	24	
Poland	Miss Polonia	B2	November 26, 2017, at the Hotel Narvil Conference & Spa, Serock	20	
China	The Miss China	A2	December 9, 2017, at the Royal Hotel, Guangzhou	24	
Colombia	Miss Grand Colombia^{[β]}	A1	February 11, 2018, at the BH Tempo Hotel, Villeta, Cundinamarca	5	
Namibia	Miss Grand Namibia^{[α]}	A1	March 3, 2018, at the Safari Hotel, Windhoek	N/A	
Philippines	Binibining Pilipinas	B1	March 18, 2018, at the Smart Araneta Coliseum, Quezon City, Metro Manila	40	
Laos	Miss Grand Laos	A1	March 24, 2018, at the ITECC Shopping Mall, Xaysetha, Vientiane	12	
Mexico	Miss Mexico	B1	May 4, 2018, at the Salón Imperial de Villa Toscana Eventos, Hermosillo, Sonora	32	
New Zealand	Miss World New Zealand	B1	May 5, 2018, at the SkyCity Convention Centre, Auckland	11	
Ecuador	Miss Ecuador	B2	May 8, 2018, at the Hotel Oro Verde de Machala, Machala, El Oro	22	
Malaysia	Miss Grand Malaysia	A1	May 12, 2018, at the Grand Pacific Ballroom, Evolve Concept Mall, Petaling Jaya, Selangor	24	
Ukraine	Queen of Ukraine	A2	May 23, 2018, at the Parkovy Exhibition and Convention Center, Kyiv	12	
Albania	Miss Grand Albania and Kosovo^{[β]}	A1	May 26, 2018, at the California Resort, Lipljan, Pristina	14	
Kosovo	Miss Grand Albania and Kosovo^{[β]}	A1	May 26, 2018, at the California Resort, Lipljan, Pristina	14	
Paraguay	Miss Grand Paraguay	A1	June 9, 2018, at the Theater of the Americas, Paraguayan-American Cultural Center (CCPA), Asunción	15	
Australia	Miss Grand Australia	A1	June 16, 2018, at the Sofitel Sydney Wentworth, Sydney	28	
Netherlands	Miss Grand Netherlands	A1	June 17, 2018, at the Apollo Hotel, Vinkeveen	10	
Suriname	Miss Grand Netherlands	B2	June 17, 2018, at the Apollo Hotel, Vinkeveen	10	
India	Femina Miss India	B2	June 19, 2018, at the DOME, Sardar Vallabhbhai Patel Indoor Stadium, Mumbai	30	
Bolivia	Miss Bolivia	B1	June 23, 2018, at the Salón Sirionó dela FexPo, Santa Cruz de la Sierra	24	
England	Miss International United Kingdom	B1	June 24, 2018, at the Park Hall Hotel, Preston, Lancashire	53	
Wales	Miss International United Kingdom	B1	June 24, 2018, at the Park Hall Hotel, Preston, Lancashire	53	
Scotland	Miss International United Kingdom	B1	June 24, 2018, at the Park Hall Hotel, Preston, Lancashire	53	
Spain	Miss Grand Spain^{[β]}	A1	June 30, 2018, at the Cerezo Theater, Carmona	34	
Bahamas	Miss Grand Bahamas^{[α]}	A1	July 1, 2018, at the Meliá Nassau Beach – All-Inclusive Resort, Nassau	7	
Azerbaijan	Miss and Mister Grand Azerbaijan	A1	July 8, 2018, at the Elektra Events Hall, Baku	10	
Thailand	Miss Grand Thailand	A1	July 14, 2018, at the Bangkok International Trade and Exhibition Centre, Bangkok	77	
Indonesia	Miss Grand Indonesia	A1	July 21, 2018, at the Jakarta Convention Center, Central Jakarta	30	
Japan	Miss Grand Japan	A1	July 31, 2018, at the WOMB Night Club, Shibuya, Tokyo	17	
Nepal	Miss Grand Nepal	A1	August 4, 2018, at the Hotel Gurkha Heritage	10	
South Africa	Miss Grand South Africa	A1	August 4, 2018, at the Atterbury Theatre, Pretoria	14	
US Virgin Islands	Miss Universe U.S. Virgin Islands	B2	August 11, 2018, at the Pistarckle Theater, St. Thomas	5	
Jamaica	Miss Universe Jamaica	B1	August 24, 2018, at the Pegasus Hotel, New Kingston	24	
Canada	Miss Grand Canada^{[β]}	A1	August 26, 2018, at the Chinese Cultural Center, Calgary	15	
South Korea	Miss Grand Korea	A1	August 30, 2018, at the Dinoche Convention, Seongdong, Seoul	22	
Estonia	Miss Queen of Scandinavia	B1	September 1, 2018, at the Grand Hotel, Stockholm, Sweden	35	
Norway	Miss Queen of Scandinavia	B1	September 1, 2018, at the Grand Hotel, Stockholm, Sweden	35	
Bulgaria	Miss World Bulgaria	B1	September 12, 2018, at the Rainbow Plaza, Sofia	22	
Denmark	Miss Denmark	B2	September 12, 2018, at the Circus Building, Copenhagen	30	
Ethiopia	Ethiopian Beauty Queens	B1	September 13, 2018, at the Intercontinental Addis Hotel, Addis Ababa	40	
Cambodia	Miss Grand Cambodia	A1	September 13, 2018, at the Nagaworld Hotel Grand Ballroom, Phnom Penh	27	
Cook Islands	Miss Cook Islands	B1	September 15, 2018, at the Avarua National Auditorium, Avarua	7	
Sri Lanka	Miss Grand Sri Lanka	A1	September 16, 2018, at the Waters Edge, Colombo	14	
Vietnam	Miss Vietnam	B2	September 16, 2018, at the Phu Tho Indoor Stadium, Ho Chi Minh City	43	
Finland	Miss Finland	B2	September 29, 2018, at the Billnäs Ironworks, Billnäs, Raseborg	10	
Mongolia	Miss World Mongolia	B2	September 2018	N/A	
Singapore	Miss Singapore^{[α]}	B1	September 2018	N/A	
Note^α The elected representative did not compete internationally and no replacement was assigned.^β The elected representative(s) resigned or were dethroned, and were later replaced by the runner-up or an appointed representative(s).
