= Lexi Wilson =

Bahamian model (born 1991)

- Born: Lexi Wilson; 1995 (age 30–31); Nassau, The Bahamas
- Height: 1.73 m (5 ft 8 in)
- Beauty pageant titleholder
- Title: Miss Universe Bahamas 2013
- Hair color: Black
- Major competitions: Miss Universe Bahamas 2013 (Winner); Miss Universe 2013

Lexi Wilson (born 1991) is a Bahamian beauty pageant titleholder who won Miss Universe Bahamas 2013 and represented her country at the Miss Universe 2013 pageant.

== Early life ==
In January 1991, Wilson was born in Nassau, Bahamas.

== Below Deck Mediterranean ==
Lexi appeared on Below Deck Mediterranean season 6 in 2021.

Awards and achievements
Preceded by Celeste Marshall	Miss Universe Bahamas; 2013	Succeeded by Tomii Culmer
