= Miss Bahamas 2012 =

- Date: July 30, 2012
- Venue: Imperial Ballroom in the Atlantis Resort, Paradise Island, The Bahamas
- Broadcaster: ZNS-TV
- Entrants: 20
- Placements: 10
- Winner: Celeste Marshall; Green Turtle Cay
- Congeniality: Rakia Rolle; Bimini
- Best National Costume: De'Andra Bannister; Crooked Island
- Photogenic: De'Andra Bannister; Crooked Island

The Miss Bahamas 2012 pageant was held on July 30, 2012. Twenty candidates competed for the national crown. The chosen winner will represent The Bahamas at the Miss Universe 2012 and Miss International 2012 pageants. The costume of the winner of the best national costume award will be used at Miss Universe 2012. Miss World Bahamas will enter Miss World 2013. The First Runner Up entered Miss Intercontinental, the Second Runner Up entered Miss Supranational, and the Third Runner Up entered Top Model of the World. This is the last time Miss Bahamas World and Miss Bahamas Universe were held together in one Miss Bahamas pageant. After this, the Miss Bahamas Organization restructured the contest into two separate Miss Bahamas pageants, one to crown Miss Bahamas for Miss World and the other to crown Miss Bahamas for Miss Universe.

== Final results ==
Final results	Contestant
Miss Universe Bahamas 2012	Green Turtle Cay - Celeste Marshall
Miss World Bahamas 2013	Crooked Island - De'Andra Bannister
1st Runner-up Miss Universe	Capital City - Autumn Joy Dames
1st Runner-up Miss World	Nassau, Bahamas - Analicia Thompson
3rd Runner-up	South Eleuthera - Irina Key
Semifinalist	Bimini - Rakia Rolle; East Grand Bahama - Kahtura Fernander; Harbour Island - Jasmine Forbes; Mayaguana - Deandra Harris; San Salvador - Reneika Knowles

=== Special awards ===
- Miss Photogenic - De'Andra Bannister (Crooked Island)
- Miss Congeniality - Rakia Rolle (Bimini)
- Best National Costume - De'Andra Bannister (Crooked Island)

== Official delegates ==
Represent	Contestant	Age	Height	Hometown	Sponsor
Acklins	Lauren Floremine	18	1.74 m (5 ft 8 1/2 in)	Nassau	
Bimini	Rakia Rolle	20	1.75 m (5 ft 9 in)	Nassau	Miss Enviroscape 2000
Capital City	Autumn Joy Dames	21	1.78 m (5 ft 10 in)	Nassau	PLL Management and Consultants
Central Abaco	Nevandria Rolle	21	1.81 m (5 ft 11 1/2 in)	Coopers Town	Miss Abaco
Crooked Island	De'Andra Bannister	23	1.78 m (5 ft 10 in)	Nassau	Olives Mediterranean
East Grand Bahama	Kahtura Fernander	21	1.77 m (5 ft 9 1/2 in)	Nassau	Javotte's House of Couture
Exuma	Adria Flowers	19	1.70 m (5 ft 7 in)	West End	Bare Beauty
Freeport	Andrea Blackmen	25	1.77 m (5 ft 9 1/2 in)	Freeport	
Green Turtle Cay	Celeste Marshall	19	1.82 m (5 ft 11 1/2 in)	Nassau	D.S. Lifestyles
Harbour Island	Jasmine Forbes	20	1.73 m (5 ft 8 in)	Harbour Town	Island Luck Casino and Lottery
Hope Town	Analicia Thompson	23	1.79 m (5 ft 10 1/2 in)	Freeport	Idyllic
Long Island	Alisson Willimias	24	1.71 m (5 ft 7 1/2 in)	Nassau	
Mayaguana	Deandra Harris	21	1.72 m (5 ft 7 1/2 in)	Nassau	Coco Plum Bahamas Resort
New Providence	Ebony Johnson	24	1.80 m (5 ft 11 in)	Nassau	The Cure
North Andros	Landra Eron	20	1.74 m (5 ft 8 1/2 in)	Andros Town	
Rum Cay	Elizabeth Xavier	22	1.76 m (5 ft 9 1/2 in)	West End	
San Salvador	Reneika Knowles	26	1.80 m (5 ft 11 in)	Andros Town	Star Car Rental
South Eleuthera	Irina Key	18	1.83 m (6 ft 0 in)	Freetown	Bahamas Construction International Ltd
Spanish Wells	Mo'Nik Evans-Santos	18	1.80 m (5 ft 11 in)	Spanish Wells	
West Grand Bahama	Rochelle Alexandre	25	1.79 m (5 ft 10 1/2 in)	West End	Advance Auto Paint & Supplies
