= Angela Martini =

Albanian-Swiss model, beauty pageant titleholder

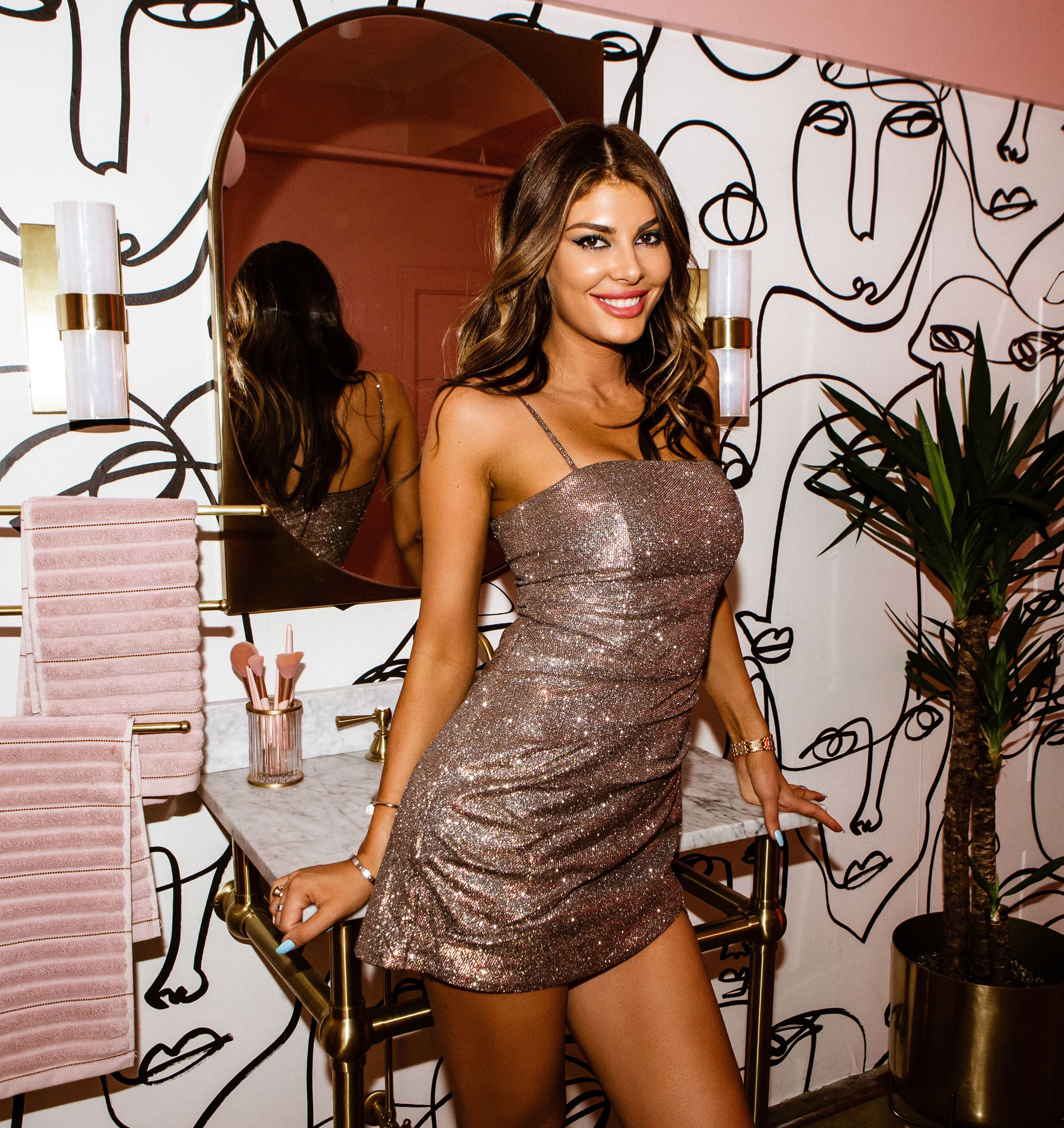
- Born: Angela Martini; 23 May 1986 (age 40); Shkodër, Albania
- Occupation: Model
- Height: 1.78 m (5 ft 10 in)
- Spouse: Dragoş Săvulescu (m. 2017)
- Beauty pageant titleholder
- Title: Miss Universe Albania 2010
- Agency: Elite Modeling Agency of New York
- Hair color: Brown
- Eye color: Light brown
- Major competitions: Miss Universe Albania 2010 (Winner); Miss Universe 2010 (Top 10)
- Website: angelamartini.me

Angela Martini (born Angjela Martini; 23 May 1986) is an Albanian-Swiss model, life coach, movie producer, author and beauty pageant titleholder who won Miss Universe Albania 2010.

== Early life ==
Angela Martini was born in Shkodër, Albania in 1986. During this time, there was political instability as communism entered the region. She grew up in poverty and suffered a difficult childhood. Concerned for her safety, her mother sent her to Switzerland to live with her father at the age of ten. She then moved to the United States (Miami) at the age of 21.

== Personal life and career ==
After moving to Miami, Martini began modelling and participating in pageants. After moving to New York and Los Angeles, Martini became a life coach, movie producer, and wrote her debut biography.

=== Modelling ===
Martini has been modelling since she was 18, but her career took off after she moved to Miami at the age of 21. She is signed with NEXT Model Management in Miami, Florida, and Elite Model Management in New York City. Once in America, Martini quickly started booking campaigns with retail giants such as JCPenney and Macy's. Martini also worked with GQ, Maxim, and Esquire. She has appeared in Mercedes-Benz Fashion Week, Mercedes-Benz Fashion Week Miami as well as in Radar Online, OK Magazine, and Star Magazine's "Spotted" columns. Martini modeled in the 2008 edition of Sports Illustrated Swimsuit Issue and was interviewed for the February 2011 issue of Esquire.

=== Pageantry ===
Martini competed in the 2010 Miss Universe pageant in Las Vegas, Nevada, placing 6th with a score of 8.693. She currently holds the record for the highest-placed Miss Universe Albania in history.

=== Interviews ===
In August 2019, Trend Prive Magazine spoke with Martini about her journey from being a model to venturing into being an author and licensed life coach. Angela Martini also spoke with Viva Glam Magazine, Paraeles, Women Fitness, Trend Prive Magazine, Haute Living, Times of India, Thrive Global, and others about her modelling, Miss Universe competition, becoming a life coach, as well as the launch of her Biography.

=== Life Coach ===
In 2017, Angela Martini became a certified Life Coach.

=== Author ===
In 2019, Angela Martini wrote her debut book "Love. Hope. Light".

== Filmography ==
In 2019, Angela Martini debuted as a producer in A Way Out (2018) and then produced The Fusion (2020).

== Bibliography ==
- Love. Hope. Light. (2019) ISBN 9781950906208

== Photos ==
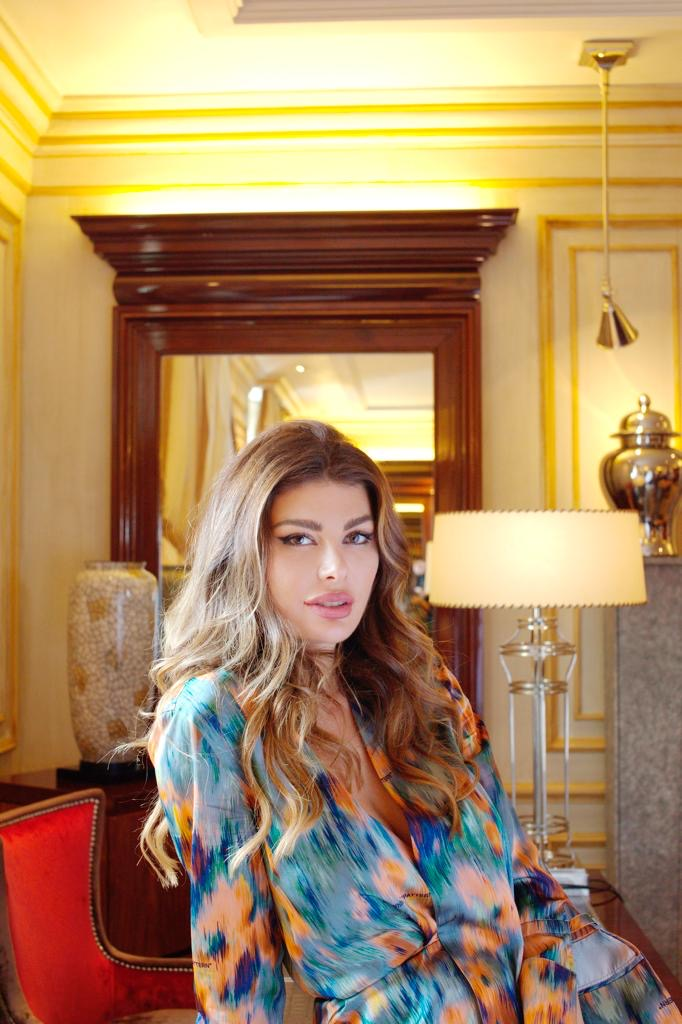
Angela Martini

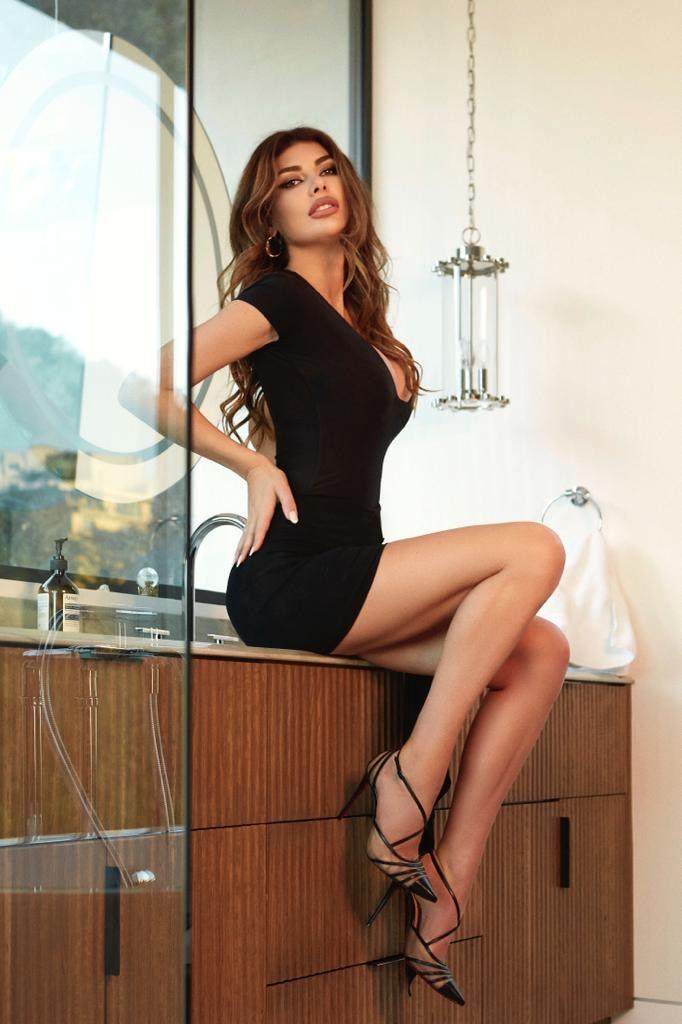
Angela Martini

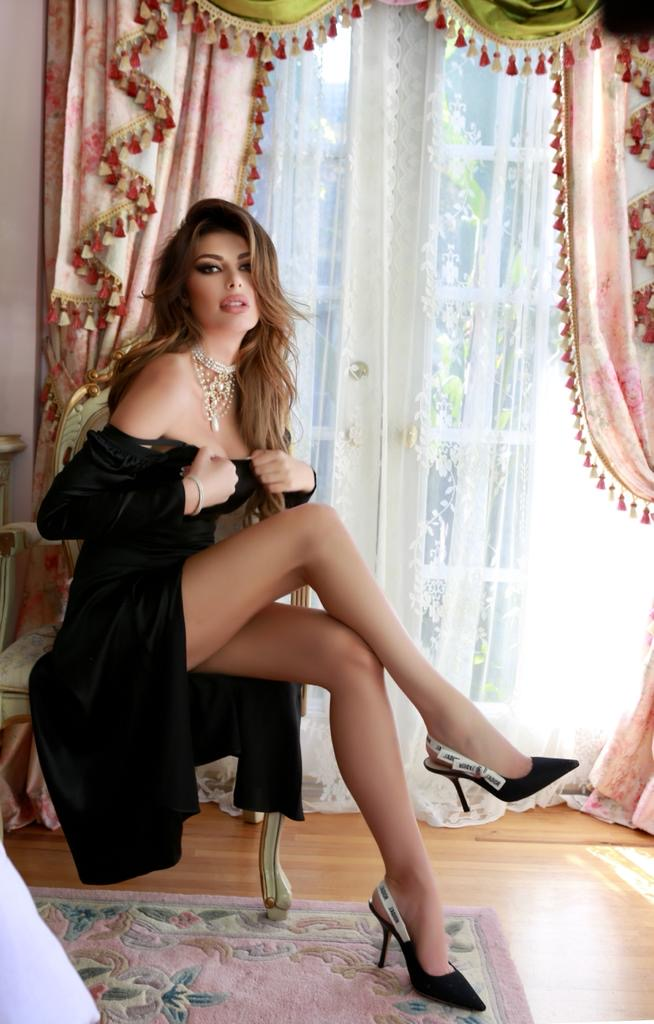
Angela Martini

Awards and achievements
Preceded by Hasna Xhukiçi	Miss Universe Albania; 2010	Succeeded by Xhesika Berberi
