= Miss Universe Bahamas =

National beauty pageant competition in The Bahamas

- Formation: 1963; 63 years ago
- Type: Beauty pageant
- Headquarters: Nassau
- Location: The Bahamas
- Official language: English
- Owner: Westpoint Media Global Inc.
- National Director: Anthony Smith
- Affiliations: Miss Universe
- Website: missbahamaspageant.org

Miss Bahamas Universe or Miss Universe Bahamas is a national beauty pageant that selects The Bahamas representative to the Miss Universe pageant.

== History ==
Miss Universe Bahamas was established in 2008 by Tom Youth and Andy Odenbach in the Bahamas. The Miss Universe representatives from the Bahamas were previously selected by the Miss Bahamas pageant.

=== Organizers ===
The Miss Bahamas Committee ran the pageant for 40 years. In 2002, the franchise for the Miss Universe pageant was awarded to Theophilus Fritz and Gaynell Rolle who ran it until 2009. In 2010, the Miss Bahamas Organization (MBO) headed by journalist Michelle Malcolm was awarded the franchise for Miss Universe. At the time, MBO, which was formed in 2006, and had produced the Miss World Bahamas pageant since the year 2007.

After receiving the Miss Universe franchise, MBO combined the Miss World and Miss Universe systems into one local pageant, crowning one winner who would compete in both pageants. This was the first time in The Bahamas that the license for both Miss Universe and Miss World were held by the same organization. Braneka Bassett competed in Miss Universe in 2010 and went unplaced. She then competed in Miss World that same year and advanced to the semifinals. The following year, MBO crowned two winners - Anastagia Pierre for Miss Universe and Sasha Joyce for Miss World. Runners up went to Miss Supranational and Miss Intercontinental. In 2012, due to a change in date of Miss World, Daronique Young, first runner up to Sasha Joyce in 2011, represented The Bahamas at Miss World where she was unplaced. Celeste Marshall who was crowned Miss Universe Bahamas in 2012, competed at Miss Universe in 2012. De'Andra Bannister who was crowned Miss Bahamas, competed at Miss World 2013 and was unplaced.

In 2013 MBO underwent a major restructuring, and separated the two national pageants into separate events; Miss Universe Bahamas and Miss World Bahamas. In 2014 MBO sent Tomacina "Tomii" Culmer to Miss Universe, and was the last competition wher MBO held the Miss Universe franchise for The Bahamas.

In 2015, 2016 and 2017 the franchise as Miss Universe Bahamas was operated by Albany Resort and Ivy Lane Ltd. Michelle Collie and Loretta Thomas were national directors. In 2015, Toria Nichole Penn represented The Bahamas at Miss Universe, with Cherell Williamson in 2016, and Yasmine Cooke in 2017. This was the last time Albany Resort and Ivy Lane Ltd. would hold the franchise.

In 2018 the franchise was operated by Westpoint Media Global Ltd, who changed the name back to Miss Bahamas Universe. At the time, they had produced the Miss Teen Bahamas Scholar pageant since 2016, and Miss Teen Bahamas International from 2012 to 2015.

On September 16, 2018 Danielle Simone Grant was selected as Miss Bahamas Universe and represented The Bahamas in Bangkok, Thailand at Miss Universe on December 16, 2018.

=== National directors ===
- Eva Macoherso Williams (1963―1968)
- Hazel Thompson (1969-1989)
- Thelma McQueeney (1990―1996)
- Theasa Haven Adderly (1997―2001)
- Theopiluz Fritz and Gaynelle Role (2002―2009)
- Michelle Malcolm (2010―2015)
- Tom Youth, Andy Odenbach, and Michelle Collie (2016―2017)
- Anthony Smith (2018―present)

== Titleholders ==
- : Declared as Winner
- : Ended as runner-up or top 5/6 qualification
- : Ended as one of the finalists or semifinalists
- : Ended as special awards winner

Year	Island Group	Miss Bahamas	Placement	Special Award(s)	Notes
2026	Exuma	Shawndra Henfield	TBA		
2025	Grand Bahama	Maliqué Maranda	Unplaced		Previously Miss Supranational Bahamas 2023 and Miss Teenager Universe Bahamas 2017
2024	Andros	Selvinique Wright	Unplaced		Previously Miss Grand Bahamas 2016
2023	Long Island	Melissa Ingraham	Unplaced		Ingraham, the titleholder, wore Bahamas sash again after 2 years, dropping the word "The".
2022	Long Island	Angel Cartwright	Unplaced		
2021	New Providence	Chantel O'Brian	Top 10	Spirit of Carnival Award	At Miss Universe, Brian wore The Bahamas sash and this is for the first time after many years Bahamas changed its sash name from Bahamas to The Bahamas.
2020	Long Island	Shauntae-Ashleigh Miller	Unplaced		There was no pageant in 2020, due to the COVID-19 pandemic. Miller, a runner-up of 2019 was appointed as Miss Bahamas Universe 2020 by the MBU Organization.
2019	Grand Bahama	Tarea Sturrup	Unplaced		
2018	New Providence	Danielle Grant	Unplaced		Anthony Smith (Westpoint Media Global Inc.) directorship.
Miss Universe Bahamas
2017	New Providence	Yasmine Cooke	Unplaced		
2016	New Providence	Cherell Williamson	Unplaced		Tom Youth, Andy Odenbach and Michelle Collie (Ivy Lane Ltd.) directorship
Miss Bahamas (MB Organization)
2015	New Providence	Toria Nichole Penn	Unplaced		
2014	New Providence	Tomacina Culmer	Unplaced		
2013	New Providence	Lexi Wilson	Unplaced		
2012	New Providence	Celeste Marshall	Unplaced		
2011	New Providence	Anastagia Pierre	Unplaced		
2010	Grand Bahama	Braneka Bassett	Unplaced		Michelle Malcolm directorship.
Miss Bahamas Universe (MBUO)
2009	Grand Bahama	Kiara Sherman	Unplaced		
2008	New Providence	Sacha Scott	Unplaced		
2007	New Providence	Trinere Lynes	Unplaced		
2006	New Providence	Samantha Carter	Unplaced		
2005	New Providence	Denia Ikena Nixon	Unplaced		
2004	New Providence	Raquel Simone Horton	Unplaced		
2003	Eleuthera	Nadia Johnson	Unplaced		
2002	New Providence	Nadia Rodgers-Albury	Unplaced		Theopiluz Fritz and Gaynelle Role directorship.
Miss Bahamas (MB Committee)
2001	New Providence	Nakera Simms	Unplaced	Miss Congeniality	
2000	New Providence	Mikala Tracey Moss	Unplaced		
1999	New Providence	Glennis Knowles	Unplaced		
1998	New Providence	Juliette Deanza Sargent	Unplaced		
1997	New Providence	Nestaea Sandra Sealy	Unplaced		Theasa Havel Adderley directorship.
1996	New Providence	Michelle Rae Collie	Unplaced		
1995	New Providence	Shammine Tenika Lindsay	Unplaced		
1994	New Providence	Meka Knowles	Unplaced		
1993	New Providence	Marietta Ricina Sands	Unplaced		
1992	New Providence	Fontella Dean Chipman	Unplaced		
1991	New Providence	Farrah Saunders	Unplaced		
1990	New Providence	Lisa Nichelle Sawyer	Unplaced		Thelma McQueeney directorship.
1989	New Providence	Natasha Inga Ramirez	Unplaced		
1988	New Providence	Natasha Christine Pinder	Unplaced		
1987	New Providence	Betty Ann Hanna	Unplaced		
1986	New Providence	Marie Brown	Unplaced		
1985	New Providence	Cleopatra Maria Adderly	Unplaced		
1984	New Providence	Pamela Lois Parker	Did not compete		The Miss Bahamas Committee boycotted the pageant due to South Africa competing.
1983	New Providence	Christina Maria Thompson	Unplaced		
1982	New Providence	Ava Marilyn Burke	Unplaced	Miss Photogenic	
1981	New Providence	Linda Teresa Smith	Unplaced	Miss Congeniality	
1980	New Providence	Darlene Cecilia Davis	Unplaced		
1979	New Providence	Lolita Louise Ambrister	Unplaced		
1978	New Providence	Dulcie Louise Mullings	Unplaced		
1977	New Providence	Paulette Rosetta Borghardt	Unplaced		
1976	New Providence	Sharon Elaine Smith	Unplaced		
1975	New Providence	Sonia Chipman	Unplaced		
1974	New Providence	Agatha Elizabeth Watson	Unplaced		
1973	Did not compete				
1972	New Providence	Deborah Jane Taylor	Unplaced		
1971	New Providence	Muriel Terah Rahming	Unplaced		
1970	New Providence	Antoinette Patrice De Gregory	Unplaced		
1969	New Providence	Joan Bowe	Unplaced		Hazel Thompson directorship.
1968	New Providence	Brenda Fountain	Unplaced		
1967	New Providence	Elizabeth Knowles	Unplaced		
1966	New Providence	Sandra Zoe Jarrett	Unplaced		
1965	New Providence	Janet Thompson	Unplaced		
1964	New Providence	Catherine Cartwright	Unplaced		
1963	New Providence	Sandra Louise Young	Unplaced		Eva Macoherso Williams directorship.

== See also ==
- Miss Bahamas
- Mister Bahamas
- Miss Grand Bahamas
