= Trejsi Sejdini =

Miss Universe Albania 2018

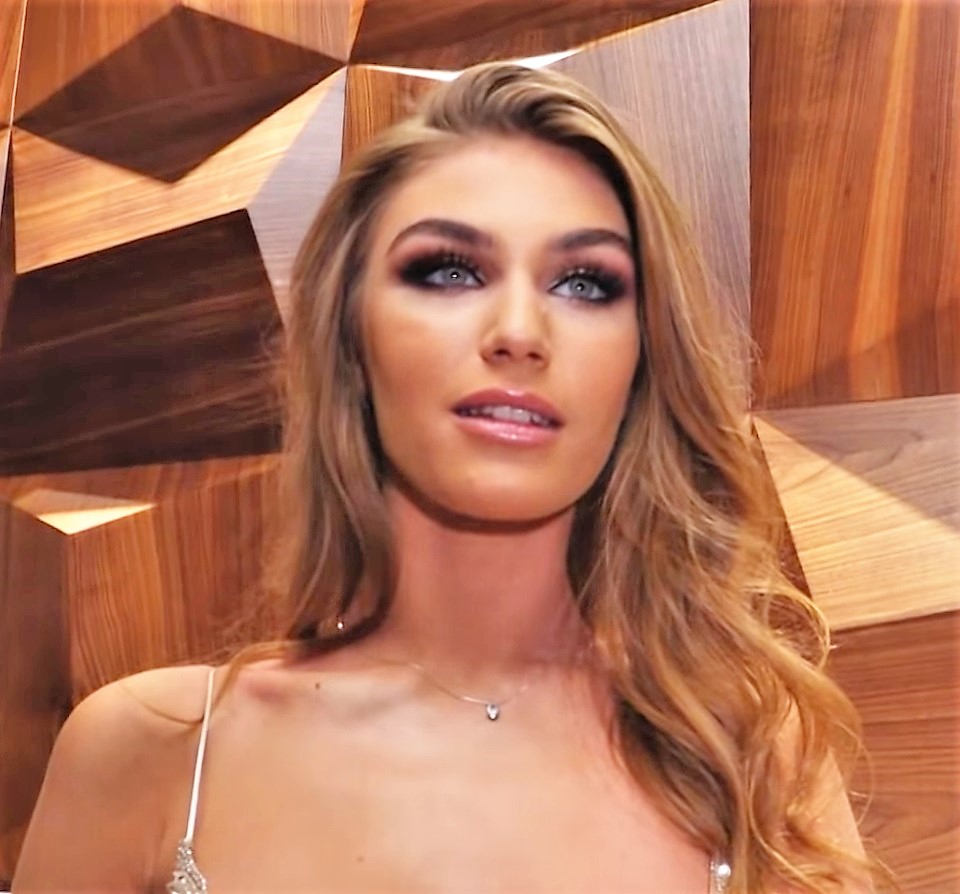
- Sejdini on T7 Kosovo television in 2018
- Born: Trejsi Sejdini; May 30, 2000 (age 26); Elbasan, Albania
- Height: 1.83 m (6 ft 0 in)
- Beauty pageant titleholder
- Title: Miss Universe Albania 2018
- Hair color: Blonde
- Eye color: Green
- Major competitions: Miss Universe Albania 2018 (Winner); Miss Universe 2018 (Unplaced)
- Website: Trejsi Sejdini on Instagram

Trejsi Sejdini (born May 30, 2000) is an Albanian model and beauty pageant titleholder who was crowned Miss Universe Albania 2018 and represented Albania at the Miss Universe 2018.

== Personal life ==
Sejdini was born in Elbasan, Albania on May 30, 2000, and lives in Tirana. In addition to her native language (Albanian), she speaks 3 foreign languages: Italian, French, and English. She joined various clips as a model in Albania, and appeared in Gang gang by Fero and Xhelozi by Mozzik. Sejdini participated, at the age of 16, in Miss Universe Albania 2016 pageant. She became the winner in the Miss Universe Albania 2018 pageant in June 2018 at Pallati i Kongreseve. In the same period she became also a social media influencer obtaining success and then she entered in the entertainment world by appearing on various television programs. She represented, at the age of 18, Albania at the Miss Universe 2018 pageant in December 2018.

== Pageantry ==
Sejdini was crowned as Miss Universe Albania 2018 pageant on June 6, 2018.

Sejdini represented Albania at Miss Universe 2018 pageant on December 17, 2018.

Awards and achievements
Preceded by Blerta Leka	Miss Universe Albania; 2018	Succeeded by Cindy Marina
