= Franceska Rustem =

Albanian model and beauty queen

Françeska Rustem
- Born: 31 January 2005 (age 21); Durrës, Albania
- Height: 1.80 m (5 ft 11 in)
- Beauty pageant titleholder
- Title: Miss Universe Albania 2024
- Major competitions: Miss Universe Albania 2024 (Winner); Miss Universe 2024 (Unplaced)

Françeska Rustem (born 31 January 2005) is an Albanian model & beauty pageant titleholder who was crowned Miss Universe Albania 2024 and represented her country at Miss Universe 2024 pageant in Mexico in November.She also is a TV Host in Top Channel.

== Background ==
=== Early life ===
Françeska Rustem was born in Durrës, Albania.

== Pageantry ==
=== Miss Universe Albania 2024 ===
Rustemi was crowned Miss Universe Albania 2024 in a pageant held on Saturday, June 8 at the Palace of Congresses in Tirana.

=== Miss Universe 2024 ===
Rustemi represented her country at Miss Universe 2024, which was held in Mexico on 16 November 2024.

Awards and achievements
Preceded by Endi Demneri	Miss Universe Albania; 2024	Succeeded by Flavia Harizaj
