= Endi Demneri =

Albanian model and beauty pageant titleholder

- Born: Endi Demneri; 31 July 1998 (age 28); Tirana, Albania
- Occupation: Model
- Beauty pageant titleholder
- Title: Miss Universe Albania 2023
- Major competitions: Miss Universe Albania 2023 (Winner); Miss Universe 2023 (Unplaced)

Endi Demneri (born 31 July 1998) is an Albanian model and beauty pageant titleholder who was crowned as Miss Universe Albania 2023. She represented her country at Miss Universe 2023, held in El Salvador.

== Early life and family ==
Demneri was born on 31 July 1998, in Tirana, Albania into a family of fashion designers and beauty pageant titleholders. Her aunt is a fashion designer. She speaks Albanian, English, Italian and Turkish. Her cousin Irsa Demneri was Miss Shqiperia 2007.

=== Fashion ===
Demneri began her career as a model in 2014. In September 2022, Italian fashion designer Stefano Gabbana invited her to be part of a Dolce & Gabbana fashion show. She participated in Milan Fashion Week 2023.

== Pageantry ==
=== Miss Universe 2023 ===
On Thursday, 1st June 2023, the reigning titleholder, Deta Kokomani crowned Demneri as her successor and the Miss Universe Albania 2023 in Pallati i Kongreseve (The Palace of Congresses) at Dëshmorët e Kombit Boulevard in Tirana. She represented Albania at the 72nd Miss Universe competition that was held in El Salvador on November 18, 2023.

=== Personal life ===
Endi Demneri is expecting a son with her partner.

Awards and achievements
Preceded by Deta Kokomani	Miss Universe Albania; 2023	Succeeded by Franceska Rustem
