= Ersela Kurti =

Albanian model and beauty pageant titleholder

- Born: Ersela Kurti; 1990 (age 35–36); Tirana, Albania
- Height: 1.75 m (5 ft 9 in)
- Beauty pageant titleholder
- Title: Miss World Albania 2013
- Hair color: Blonde
- Eye color: Blue
- Major competitions: Miss World Albania 2013 (Winner); Miss World 2013 (Unplaced)

Ersela Kurti (born 1990) is an Albanian model and beauty pageant titleholder who was crowned Miss World Albania 2013 and then represented her country at Miss World 2013 in Indonesia but unplaced.

== Early life ==
Ersela Kurti was born and raised in Albania's capital city of Tirana. She is currently studying for her master's degree as a student of law. Between her studies, she works as a dancer on TV productions and one of her ambition is to become a presenter on Albanian TV channels.

She gained popularity in the Albania, due her ballerina career at TV Klan. Later she went to the university to study and neglected her career.

== Pageantry ==
=== Miss Universe Albania 2013 ===
Kurti was crowned Miss World Albania 2013

== Personal life ==
Kurti was engaged to an Albanian politician which was an adviser in the Albanian government.
