= Zhaneta Byberi =

Albanian model

- Born: Zhaneta Petrit Byberi; 1995 (age 30–31); Bajram Curri, Tropoje, Albania
- Modeling information
- Height: 1.80 m (5 ft 11 in)
- Hair color: Dark Brown
- Eye color: Brown
- Agency: Grace Models Agency

Zhaneta Byberi (born August 31, 1995) is an Albanian model and beauty pageant titleholder who was crowned Miss Universe Albania 2014 and represented Albania at the Miss Universe 2014. Born in Bajram Curri, she and her family left Albania when she was four, living in Belgium and England before she returned to Albania.

== Early life ==
=== Political family oppression history ===
Zhaneta Byberi, daughter of Petrit Byberi and Aishe Kurmekaj, was born in Bajram Curri, Tropoja, Albania. Zhaneta was forced to leave Albania at the age of 4, due to numerous conflicts and random family labelings as 'dangerous' and 'anti-nationalistic', thus her family members being politically pursued and repressed would lead to the result of being sent to camps risking the life of her parents and her very self with the continuation of living in Albania at that period. It was not until in 1997 that the government collapsed which caused disorder and rebellion throughout the country. The government attempted to suppress the rebellion by military force. Still, the attempt failed due to long-term corruption of the armed forces.

=== Frequent movement ===
Zhaneta left the country with her mother (her father would follow a few months later), proceeding to Belgium where they would both seek political asylum and thus permission to reside in the country. After four years of settlement in Leuven, Belgium, they continued their route towards South Yorkshire, England (after having settled for some time in other locations such as Amsterdam, Netherlands, and Paris, France) where they settled for over six years, after a number of years of frequent movement to various locations.

=== Settlement ===
Upon her return to Albania, Zhaneta commenced adjustment in her home country. Her native tongue, Albanian, having not been used since she left her birthplace, advanced rapidly. Zhaneta settled with her family in the capital of Albania, Tirana. She is known to have always been a sharp-minded, bright child that could adapt to any situation acquire knowledge and/or skill regarding different fields of knowledge by study, experience and self tuition within a brief amount of time.

== Pageantry ==
Zhaneta is known to have shown interest in pageantry and the fashion world at an early age. She initiated participation in minor pageants starting at the age of 8.

=== Miss Universe Albania 2012 ===
Zhaneta's first participation in Miss Albania occurred back in 2012 where she, at the age of 16, despite the lack of proper preparation, managed to place in the Top 10 and was also awarded 'Miss Photogenic 2012'.

=== Miss Universe Albania 2014 ===
Zhaneta was crowned Miss Universe Albania 2014 at the National Theatre of Opera and Ballet (Teatri i Operas dhe Baletit) in Tirana, Albania, on October 8, 2014. Zhaneta has been listed as the Miss Universe Albania after withdrawing Fioralba Dizdari at Miss Universe 2013 in Moscow.

=== Miss Universe 2014 ===
Zhaneta participated in Miss Universe 2014, held on January 25 in Doral, Florida, USA, but failed to place among the semifinalist. Her journey to 'Miss Universe' consisted of everyday physical training, walking expertise progression, posture development and much more during the time range of three weeks up to the commencement of the opening night.

== General references ==
- "Albania: Zhaneta Byberi". missuniverse.org. IMG Universe. Archived from the original on January 4, 2016.

Awards and achievements
Preceded by Kristina Bakiu	Miss Universe Albania; 2014	Succeeded by Megi Luka
