= Miss Grand Bahamas 2018 =

1st Miss Grand Bahamas competition, beauty pageant edition

- Date: 1 July 2018
- Entertainment: Chase Fernander
- Venue: Meliá Nassau Beach – All-Inclusive Resort, Nassau
- Broadcaster: IslandLuck TV
- Entrants: 7
- Placements: 4
- Winner: Dannise Bain (New Providence)

Miss Grand Bahamas 2018 was the inaugural edition of the Miss Grand Bahamas pageant, held at the Meliá Nassau Beach – All-Inclusive Resort, Nassau, on 1 July 2018. Seven contestants representing the country's seven island groups competed for the title. At the end of the event, the representative of New Providence, Dannise Bain, was announced the winner.

The event was organized by a Nassau-based fashion designer, Navado Dawkins, with financial support from several local related businesses. Its preliminary contest was held on 10 June at the Nassau Botanical Gardens, where all qualified candidates competed to secure a spot in the top 4 finalists.

After winning the contest, Bain was expected to represent the country at the Miss Grand International 2018 pageant in Myanmar. However, the American Embassy in the Bahamas refused her entry into the country for the connecting flight to Myanmar, which caused her to withdraw from the international competition. The pageant organizer later discovered the reason for such a circumstance was a precondition that happened when she resided in the United States; nonetheless, she did not inform the organizer of such a situation before entering the pageant. As a result, Bain automatically forfeited the title.

Initially, Dawkins planned to organize the pageant annually, but the project was canceled due to the aforementioned circumstances.

The national finalists include;

- Andros – Cornesha Colebrooke (3rd runner-up)
- Eleuthera – Alexandria Pennerman
- Exuma – Lakeira Wright
- Grand Bahama – Moñice Nazon (2nd runner-up)
- Inagua – Jacoya McPhee
- New Providence – Dannise Bain (Winner)
- San Salvador – Sharnae Fernander (1st runner-up)
