= Cindy Marina =

Albanian-American model, volleyball player and beauty queen

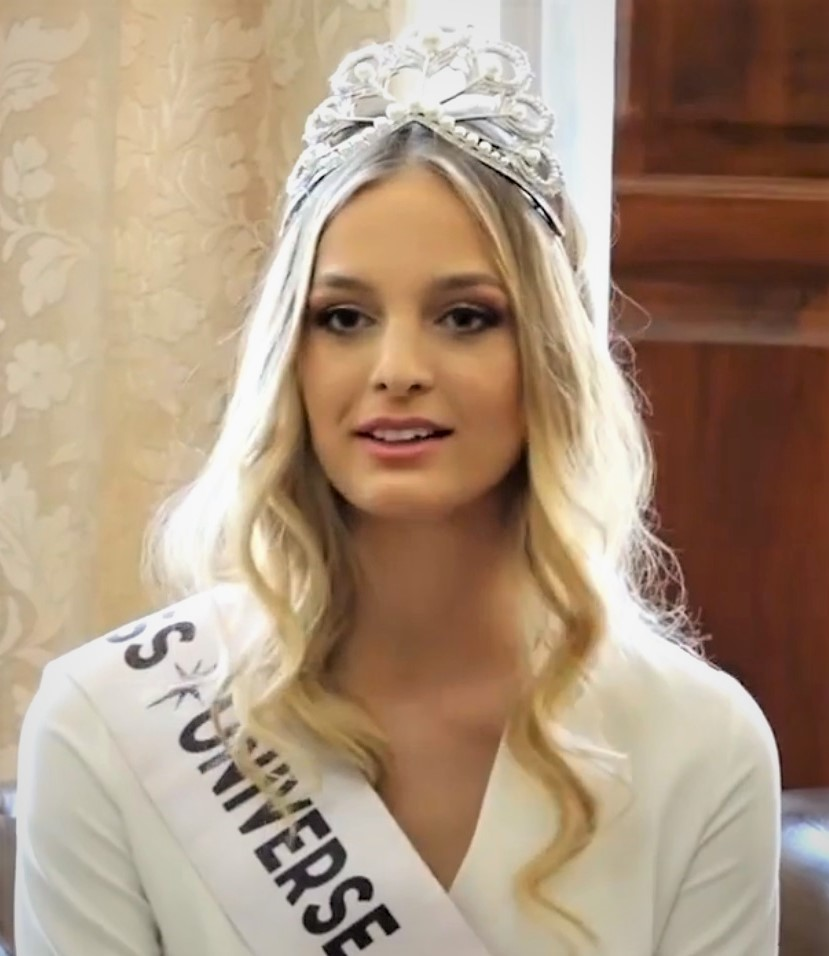
- Born: Cindy Nikolli Marina; July 18, 1998 (age 28); Chicago, Illinois, U.S.
- Education: University of Southern California
- Height: 5 ft 11 in (1.80 m)
- Spouse: Genar Topalli (m. 2025)
- Beauty pageant titleholder
- Title: Miss Universe Albania 2019
- Hair color: Blonde
- Eye color: Green
- Major competitions: Miss Universe Albania 2019 (Winner); Miss Universe 2019 (Top 20)

Cindy Marina (born July 18, 1998) is an Albanian-American tv host, model, former volleyball player and beauty pageant titleholder who was crowned Miss Universe Albania 2019. She represented Albania in the Miss Universe 2019 competition, placing in the Top 20. Outside of modeling and pageantry, Marina was a setter for the Albania women's national volleyball team, and also played for the USC Trojans women's volleyball team during her studies at the University of Southern California.

Since 2021, Marina has been the presenter for Serie A football matches broadcast in Albania and Kosovo.

== Early life and education ==
Marina was born in Chicago, Illinois to Albanian parents Ardian and Kristina Marina from Shkodër. She was named after Cindy Crawford. Her father played collegiate football in Albania, while her mother was a professional volleyball player in Albania and Italy. She is the second of three children and only daughter.

When Marina was seven years old, the family moved from Chicago to Temecula, California. She attended Great Oak High School in Temecula, graduating in 2016. After finishing high school, Marina attended Duke University in Durham, North Carolina, but transferred to the University of Southern California in Los Angeles, California for her sophomore year, graduating in 2020. She is a member of the Pi Beta Phi (ΠΒΦ) sorority.

== Volleyball ==
Marina began playing volleyball in her youth. She was a setter on her high school team and played club volleyball at Forza1, where her mom also coached. In addition, she was a California state nominee for Gatorade Player of the Year in volleyball. After graduating from high school, Marina joined the Duke Blue Devils women's volleyball team, and was named to the Atlantic Coast Conference (ACC) All-Freshman Team. For her sophomore year, Marina left Duke and began playing for the USC Trojans women's volleyball team.

Marina joined the Albania women's national volleyball team in 2015, and led the team to a third-place finish in the Silver League during the 2018 Women's European Volleyball League in Hungary. At 17 years old, Marina became the youngest person to ever play for the Albanian national team.

== Career ==
=== Modeling and pageantry ===
Marina began modeling at age 14. Her career in modeling began after being recruited by fashion designer Ema Savahl to model her dresses; Savahl is a friend of Marina's mother. She began her pageantry career in 2019, competing in the Miss Universe Albania 2019 competition. She went on to win the competition on June 7, 2019, becoming the first American-born woman to ever win the title, and the second foreign-born to ever win the title, following Kosovo-born Agnesa Vuthaj in 2005.

Marina represented Albania at the Miss Universe 2019 pageant held in Atlanta, Georgia on December 8, 2019, and placed in the top 20. Her reign as Miss Universe Albania ended after she crowned Paula Mehmetukaj as her successor at Miss Universe Albania 2020 on September 18, 2020.

=== Television ===
In August 2021, Marina became the official presenter for Serie A football matches broadcast in Albania and Kosovo.

Awards and achievements
Preceded by Trejsi Sejdini	Miss Universe Albania; 2019	Succeeded by Paula Mehmetukaj
