= Miss Grand Albania & Kosovo 2018 =

5th Miss Grand Albania & Kosovo competition, beauty pageant edition

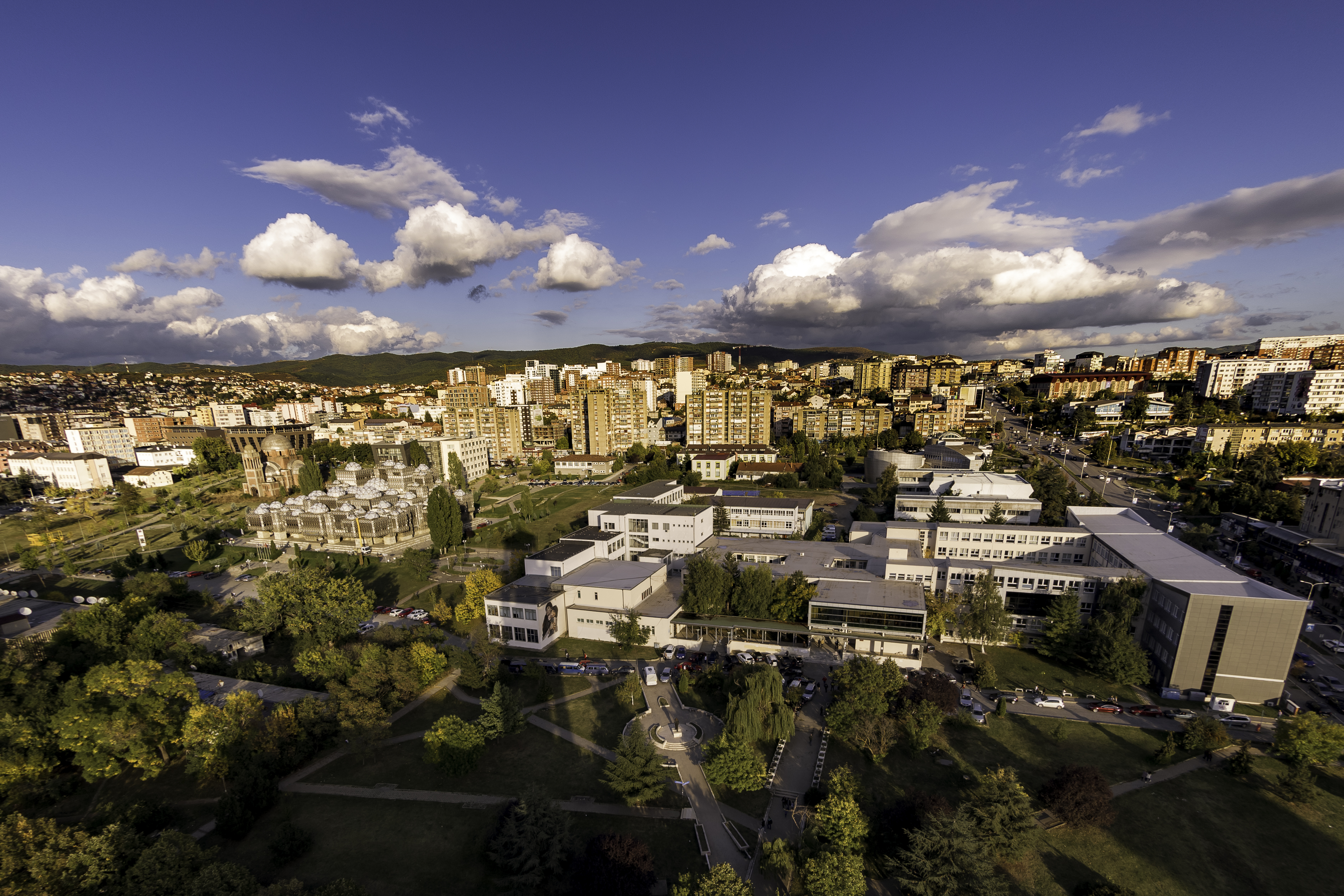
- Pristina, the host city of the contest
- Date: 26 May 2018
- Venue: California Resort, Lipljan, Pristina
- Entrants: 10
- Placements: 5
- Miss Grand Albania: Dashuria Bilaj (Pristina)
- Miss Grand Kosovo: Bernadeta Nikolla (Tirana)

Miss Grand Albania & Kosovo 2018 was the eighth edition of the Miss Grand Albania & Kosovo pageant, held at the California Resort in the town of Lipljan, Pristina. Ten candidates from Albania and Kosovo competed for the title, and a 27-year-old singer based in Pristina, Dashuria Bilaj, was named Miss Grand Albania 2018, while an Albanian model based in Zürich, Bernadeta Nikolla, was elected Miss Grand Kosovo 2018, and obtained the rights to represent the countries at Miss Grand International 2018 held in Myanmar on 25 October.

But due to financial problems, the pageant organizer chaired by Sherif Pacolli, Lens Production, did not purchase the licenses from the international parent contest and requested amounts of funds from the pageant winners, causing them to resign their titles and sue the organizer for such an incident.

After Nikolla resignation, the organizers appointed their affiliated model, Songyl Meniqi, to join the contest in Myanmar instead. However, the license of Miss Grand Albania was taken over by a Tirana-based modeling agency headed by Aleks Tanushi, Aleks Fashion Events (A.F.E.), who later appointed a former Miss Grand Albania 2017, Klaudia Kalia, who also withdrew from the international contest due to financial conflicts with Sherif Pacolli, to represent Albania in the 2018 international edition in Myanmar. But both of the newly appointed representatives were unplaced at the mentioned international contest.

This edition was also considered the last contest that Miss Grand Albania and Miss Grand Kosovo were held in parallel; the Miss Grand Kosovo pageant was held until Sherif Pacolli discontinued the franchise in 2021, while the Miss Grand Albania pageant was held annually by another organizer, Aleks Tanushi, until it was dissolved in 2021.
