= Raquel Horton =

- Born: Raquel Simone Horton; Nassau, New Providence, Bahamas
- Awards: Miss Bahamas Universe 2004; Miss Bahamas; Miss Teen Bahamas

Raquel Simone Horton is a Bahamian model and beauty pageant titleholder who won Miss Bahamas Universe 2004 among other pageant title crowns. She is also the first Bahamian to capture both Miss Bahamas and Miss Teen Bahamas titles.
