= Miss Grand Albania =

National beauty pageant in Albania

- Established: 20 July 2014; 12 years ago
- Founder: Sherif Pacolli
- Headquarters: Tirana
- Location: Albania
- Official language: Albanian
- Presidents: Arjeta Osmani (2023 – Present)
- Parent organization: Lens Production (2013-2017); Aleks Fashion Events (2018-2021); Exclusive Management (2023-present)
- Affiliations: Miss Grand International

Miss Grand Albania is an Albanian female beauty pageant founded in 2014. The pageant winner represents Albania at its international parent contest, Miss Grand International.

Since its first participation at the Miss Grand International pageant in 2014, Albanian representatives never placed in the competition.

== History ==
The pageant was founded in 2014 by a Pristina-based event organizer chaired by Sherif Pacolli, of Lens Production. In 2018, the competition license was transferred to the modeling agency managed by Aleks Tanushi, Aleks Fashion Events (A.F.E.), and its headquarters was also relocated to Tirana. Albania participated in the Miss Grand International pageant for the first time in 2014, represented by Vivian Canaj, who won the Miss Grand Albania 2014 title after competing at the Miss Grand Albania & Kosovo 2014 pageant held by Sherif Pacolli, a chairperson of the Kosovan event organizer in Pristina, Lens Production.

The first edition of Albania's Miss Grand National was held on July 20, 2014, at the California Resort in Pristina; the event was broadcast live nationwide on a Kosovan satellite television channel, RTK Live, and featured twenty national finalists, of whom a model from Tirana, Vivian Canaj, was elected the winner.

From 2014 to 2018, the pageant was held in parallel with Miss Grand Kosovo as Miss Grand Albania & Kosovo. The Miss Grand Albania pageant was held as a stand-alone pageant for the first time in 2019 when Aleks Tanushi of Aleks Fashion Events (A.F.E.) took over the Albanian franchise from Lens Production.

== Editions ==
Edition	Date	Final venue	Entrants	Ref.
1st	20 July 2014	California Resort, Lipljan, Pristina	20	
2nd	31 May 2015	Objekti i First Channel Studio, Pristina	13	
3rd	1 July 2016	California Resort, Lipljan, Pristina	17	
4th	28 February 2017	California Resort, Lipljan, Pristina	10	
5th	26 May 2018	California Resort, Lipljan, Pristina	14	
6th	23 June 2019	Teater Tirana Kinostudio, Tirana	14	
7th	16 September 2020	Teater Tirana Kinostudio, Tirana	12	
8th	26 June 2021	Teater Tirana Kinostudio, Tirana	10	

== International competition ==
The following is a list of Albanian representatives who competed at the Miss Grand International pageant.

Color keys

- : Declared as the winner
- : Ended as a runner-up
- : Ended as a finalist
- : Ended as a semifinalist
- : Ended as special awards winner

Year	Counties of Albania	Miss Grand Albania	National title	Placement	Special Awards	National Director
2026	Tirana	Sara Shehu	Appointed	Unplaced		Arjeta Osmani
2025	Lezhë	Dajana Gjoka	Finalist - Miss Universe Albania 2022	Unplaced		Arjeta Osmani
2024	Lezhë	Elsa Alijaj	Top 6 - Miss Universe Albania 2020	Unplaced		Arjeta Osmani
2023	Durrës	Angela Tanuzi	Miss World Albania 2022 (Note: Supplementary at the Miss Universe Albania and Kosovo 2022 pageant.)	Unplaced		Arjeta Osmani
Did not compete in 2022
2021	Tirana	Hygerta Hidri	Miss Grand Albania 2021	Did not compete		Aleks Tanushi
2020	Tirana	Fjorela Lezo	Miss Grand Albania 2020	Unplaced		Aleks Tanushi
2019	Tirana	Xhensila Shaba	Miss Grand Albania 2019	Unplaced		Aleks Tanushi
2018	Tirana	Klaudia Kalia	Miss Grand Albania 2017	Unplaced		Aleks Tanushi
2018	Dibër	Dashuria Bilaj	Miss Grand Albania 2018	Did not compete		Sherif Pacolli
2017	Tirana	Klaudia Kalia	Miss Grand Albania 2017	Did not compete		Sherif Pacolli
2016	Tirana	Esterina Xhaurri	Miss Grand Albania 2016	Did not compete		Sherif Pacolli
2016	Tirana	Paula Preci	Appointed	Did not compete		Sherif Pacolli
2015	Tirana	Enkelejda Lajci	Miss Grand Albania 2015	Unplaced		Sherif Pacolli
2014	Tirana	Vivian Canaj	Miss Grand Albania 2014	Unplaced		Sherif Pacolli
2013	Tirana	Dajana Luga	Appointed	Did not compete		Sherif Pacolli

== Winners gallery ==
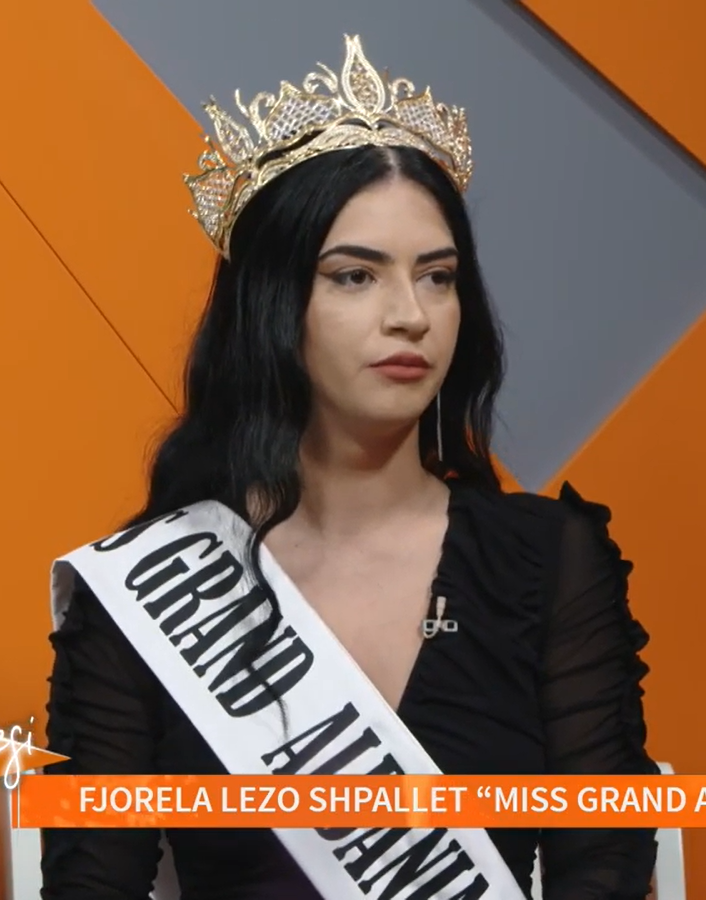
Fjorela Lezo, 2020

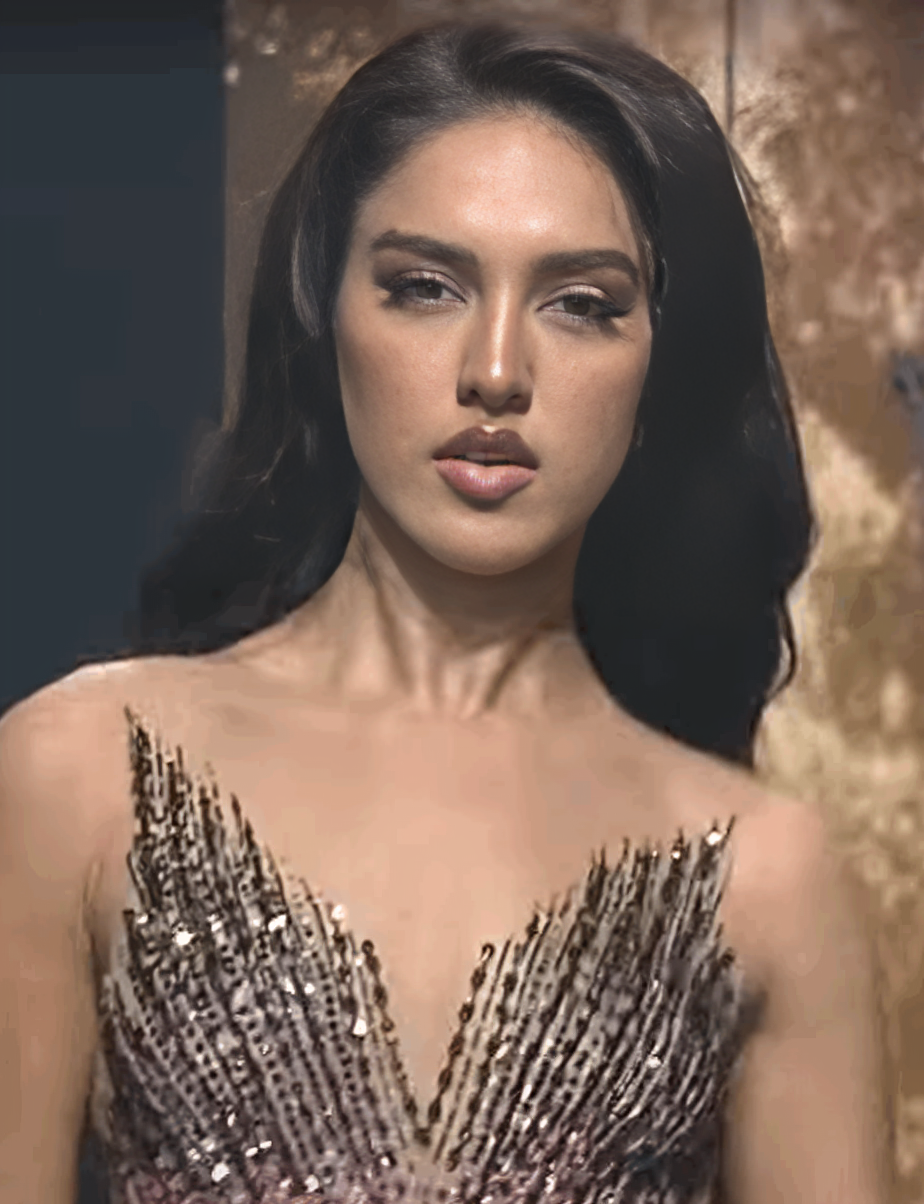
Elsa Alijaj, 2024

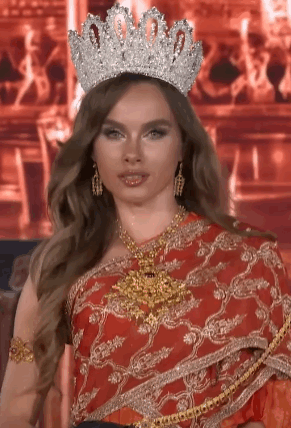
Dajana Gjoka, 2025
