= Melissa Ingraham =

Bahamian model

- Born: 26 March 1997 (age 29); Long Island, The Bahamas
- Occupation: Model
- Height: 1.79 m (5 ft 10 1/2 in)
- Beauty pageant titleholder
- Title: Miss Universe Bahamas 2023
- Major competitions: Miss Universe Bahamas 2023 (Winner); Miss Universe 2023 (Unplaced)

Melissa Ingraham (born 26 March 1997) is a Bahamian model and beauty pageant titleholder who was crowned Miss Universe Bahamas 2023 and represented her country at Miss Universe 2023.

== Pageantry ==
=== Miss Universe 2023 ===
Ingraham represented The Bahamas at The 72nd Miss Universe pageant in El Salvador at the pageant venue Adolfo Pineda National Gymnasium (Gimnasio Nacional Adolfo Pineda) on November 18, 2023.

== 2024 franchise controversy ==
In January 2024, Ingraham resigned from her title, citing what she described as inadequate support from the Miss Bahamas Universe Organization (MBUO). Ingraham stated that the organization failed to fulfill commitments outlined in her contractual agreement and that she experienced limited assistance during her participation in the 72nd Miss Universe pageant in El Salvador. According to her public statements, she was responsible for coordinating many of her public appearances and managing social media activities, and reported deficiencies in wardrobe preparation and logistical support.

Her resignation followed similar complaints made by former titleholders. Chantel O’Brian, who previously represented The Bahamas at Miss Universe and achieved a Top 10 finish along with a special award, publicly expressed dissatisfaction with the level of organisational backing she received during her reign. O’Brian indicated that she had previously submitted a formal complaint to the Miss Universe Organization but that no corrective action had been taken. Former queens Tarea Sturrup and Angel Cartwright had also raised concerns in prior years regarding management and support, contributing to what the media described as an ongoing controversy surrounding the franchise.

Following Ingraham’s resignation, O’Brian and Ingraham issued a joint statement calling on the government of The Bahamas and the Miss Universe Organisation to initiate a formal investigation into the operations, ethics and financial management of the local franchise. In response, legal representatives for the Miss Bahamas Universe Organization issued a public warning that defamatory statements could result in legal action. The organisation denied any wrongdoing and did not substantively address the specific allegations.

The Miss Bahamas Universe Organisation subsequently announced that first runner-up Taja Hudson would assume the title for the remainder of the 2023/24 term.

Awards and achievements
Preceded by Angel Cartwright	Miss Universe Bahamas; 2023	Succeeded by Selvinique Wright
