= Hasna Xhukiçi =

Albanian model (born 1998)

- Born: April 13, 1988 (age 38); Fier, Albania
- Height: 5 ft 9 in (1.75 m)
- Beauty pageant titleholder
- Title: Miss Universe Albania 2009
- Hair color: Dark blonde
- Eye color: Blue-green
- Major competitions: Miss Universe Albania 2009 (Winner); Miss Universe 2009 (Top 15)

Hasna Xhukiçi (born April 13, 1988, Fier) is an Albanian model and beauty pageant titleholder who was crowned Miss Universe Albania 2009 and represented Albania at Miss Universe 2009 in the Bahamas.

== Miss Universe 2009 ==
Hasna placed as one of the top 15 semifinalists competing in swimsuit, missing the top ten second cut by a few points. Albania took last place and debuted with Anisa Kospiri in Miss Universe 2002.

Preceded by Matilda Mecini	Miss Universe Albania; 2009	Succeeded by Angela Martini
