= Angela Tanuzi =

Albanian model and beauty queen (born 2002)

- Born: Angela Tanuzi; November 20, 2002 (age 23); Krujë, Albania
- Height: 1.74 m (5 ft 8 1/2 in)
- Beauty pageant titleholder
- Title: Miss Grand Albania 2023
- Major competitions: Miss World Albania 2022 (Winner); Miss Grand Albania 2023 (Appointed); Miss Grand International 2023 (Unplaced)

Angela Tanuzi (born November 20, 2002) is an Albanian fashion model and beauty pageant titleholder. She was crowned Miss World Albania in June 2022 and subsequently won the title of Miss Grand Albania 2023.

== Early life and education ==
She was born and raised in Krujë, Albania. She worked as a fashion model and studied law at the Mediterranean University of Albania before winning her title.

== Pageantry ==
She was crowned Miss World Albania 2022 in June. Tanuzi was Miss Grand Albania 2023 to represent Albania at the Miss Grand International 2023.

Awards and achievements
Preceded by Fjorela Lezo	Miss Grand Albania; 2023	Succeeded by Elsa Alilaj
