= Celeste Marshall =

Bahamian model (born 1992)

- Born: Celeste Marshall; September 30, 1992 (age 34); Nassau, The Bahamas
- Height: 1.82 m (5 ft 11 1/2 in)
- Beauty pageant titleholder
- Title: Miss Universe Bahamas 2012
- Hair color: Black
- Major competitions: Miss Universe Bahamas 2012 (Winner); Miss Universe 2012 (Unplaced); Top Model of the World 2015 (1st Runner-Up)

Celeste Marshall (born September 30, 1992) is a Bahamian model and beauty pageant titleholder who won Miss Universe Bahamas 2012 and represented her country in the 2012 Miss Universe pageant.

== Miss Universe Bahamas 2012 & Miss Universe 2012 ==
Celeste Marshall has been crowned Miss Bahamas Universe 2012 at the grand finale of the Miss Bahamas Universe beauty pageant, where she competed in a field of fourteen contestants. She represented her country in Miss Universe 2012, which was held at the Planet Hollywood Resort and Casino in Las Vegas, Nevada on Wednesday December 19, 2012.

Following Miss Universe, Marshall became part of the Top Model competition.

Awards and achievements
Preceded by Anastagia Pierre	Miss Universe Bahamas; 2012	Succeeded by Lexi Wilson
