= Miss Grand Kosovo =

National beauty pageant in Kosovo

- Established: 20 July 2014; 11 years ago
- Founder: Sherif Pacolli
- Type: Beauty pageant
- Headquarters: Pristina
- Location: Kosovo
- Members: Miss Grand International
- Official language: Albanian
- President: Arjeta Osmani (2023 – Present)
- Parent organization: Lens Production (2014–2021); Miss Universe Albania (2022); Exclusive Management (2023 – Present)

Miss Grand Kosovo was a national Beauty pageant in Kosovo founded by a Pristina-based event organizer chaired by Sherif Pacolli, Lens Production. The pageant winner represents the country at its international parent contest, Miss Grand International. From 2014 to 2018, the pageant was held in parallel with the Miss Grand Albania competition as Miss Grand Albania & Kosovo, but after Aleks Tanushi of Aleks Fashion Events (A.F.E.) took over the Albanian franchise in 2018, it was instead organized as a stand-alone pageant from 2019 to 2021.

The contest was dissolved in 2022 after Pacolli lost the license to another national pageant chaired by Eduart Deda, Miss Universe Albania & Kosovo, in which one of the pageant runners-up was elected Miss Grand Kosovo. The national contest, which was previously defunct in 2012, "Miss Kosovo", was brought back by Pacolli as his replacement contest in 2022.

Since its first participation at the Miss Grand International pageant in 2014, Kosovo never got any placement at such an international contest.

== History ==
Kosovo participated at the Miss Grand International for the first time in 2013 by the appointed representative Lirie Sejdija, a Pristina-based professional model. Later in 2014, after Lens Production, headed by Sherif Pacolli, acquired the license, the inaugural competition of the Miss Grand Kosovo pageant was finally happen, which the twenty-one years old Switzerland-based licensed practical nurse Naile Thaqi was announced the winner at a contest held at California Resort in the city of Lipljan on 20 July 2014, outclassing 19 other finalists. The event was broadcast nationwide by the local television channel named RTK Live. Since then, the contest was organized annually until 2021, when the license is no longer belonged to Pacolli. (Except for 2020, in which the titleholder was appointed to the position.) In 2022, the Kosovo's representative was elected through the Miss Universe Albania and Kosovo pageant, which was organized by Eduart Deda.

The contest was usually held at California Resort, located in Lipljan city, Pristina district of Kosovo, only the 2015 edition that was held in the head office of the First Channel. In 2018, the original winner, Bernadeta Nikolla, resigned the title, Nikolla stated that after acquiring the title, the national organizer asked her to pay €20,000 EUR if she wants to participate in the Miss Grand International 2018 in Myanmar and she has also been accused by such an organizer that she is undisciplined and has not been worthy of representing the country in the race, caused her to engage the lawyer for the case and found that the organizer has no license as well as no right to send any country representative to the aforementioned competition. After Nikolla resignation, the organizers appointed their affiliated model, Songyl Meniqi, to join the contest in Myanmar instead.

Gallery

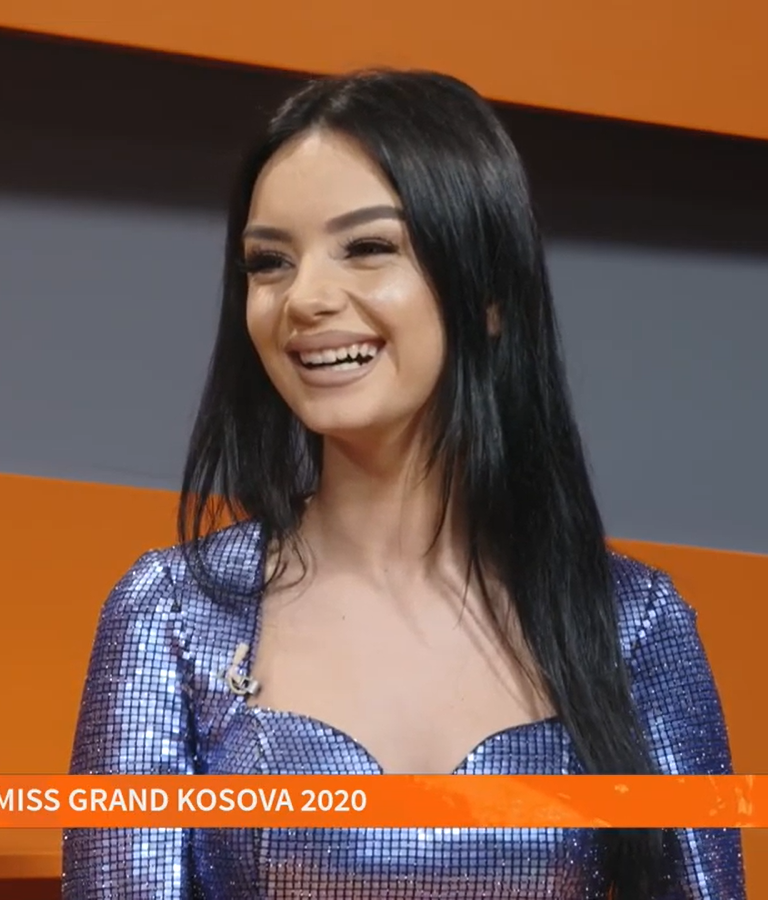
Frontina Gashi
Miss Grand Kosovo 2020

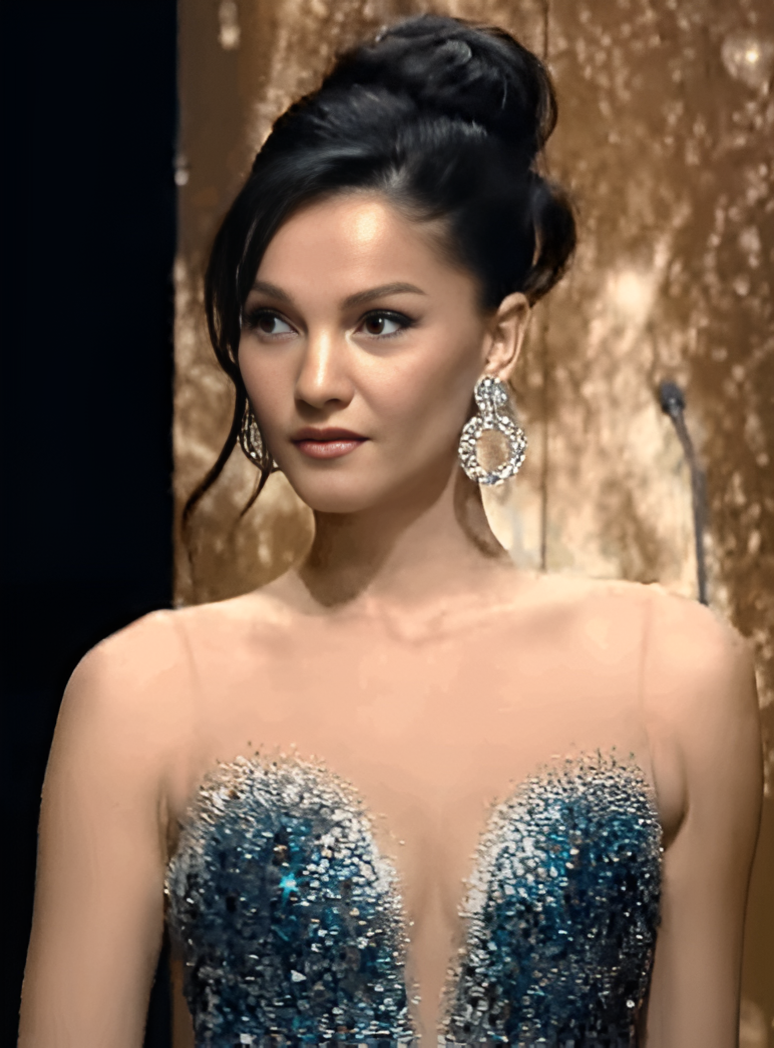
Engjellushe Zhuniqi
Miss Grand Kosovo 2024

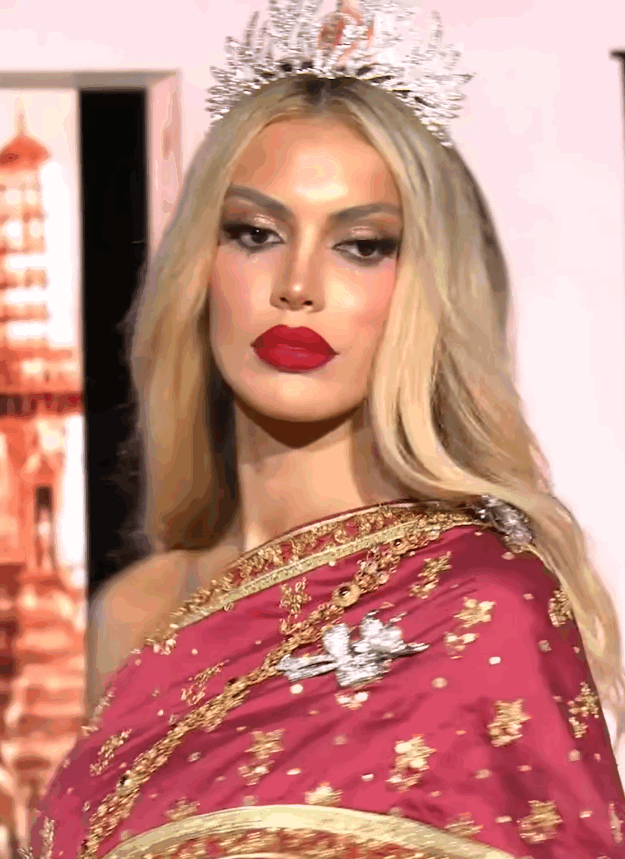
Brikena Selmani
Miss Grand Kosovo 2025

== Editions ==
The following list is the edition detail of the Miss Grand Kosovo contest, held annually from 2014 to 2021.

Year	Edition	Date	Final venue	Entrants	Winner	Ref.
2014	1st	20 July	California Resort, Lipljan, Pristina	20	Naile Thaqi	
2015	2nd	31 May	Objekti i First Channel Studio, Pristina	13	Dardanie Thaqi	
2016	3rd	1 July	California Resort, Lipljan, Pristina	17	Anxhela Dashi	
2017	4th	28 February	California Resort, Lipljan, Pristina	10	Nora Muja	
2018	5th	26 May	California Resort, Lipljan, Pristina	14	Bernadeta Nikolla	
2019	6th	23 June	California Resort, Lipljan, Pristina	14	Arlinda Prenaj	
2021	7th	11 June	California Resort, Lipljan, Pristina	15	Mejreme Hajdaraj	

== Representatives at Miss Grand International ==
Year	Miss Grand Kosovo	National Title	International Performance		National Director	Ref.
Year	Miss Grand Kosovo	National Title	Placement	Other awards	National Director	Ref.
2013	Lirie Sejdija	Appointed	Unplaced		Sherif Pacolli	
2014	Naile Thaqi	Miss Grand Kosovo 2014	Unplaced		Sherif Pacolli	
2015	Dardanie Thaqi	Miss Grand Kosovo 2015	Unable to compete		Sherif Pacolli	
2016	Anxhela Dashi	Miss Grand Kosovo 2016	Unable to compete		Sherif Pacolli	
2017	Nora Muja	Miss Grand Kosovo 2017	Unable to compete		Sherif Pacolli	
2018	Bernadeta Nikolla^{[a]}	Miss Grand Kosovo 2018	Resigned		Sherif Pacolli	
2018	Songyl Meniqi^{[b]}	Appointed	Unplaced		Sherif Pacolli	
2019	Arlinda Prenaj	Miss Grand Kosovo 2019	Unable to compete		Sherif Pacolli	
2020	Frontina Gashi	Appointed	Unplaced		Sherif Pacolli	
2021	Mejreme Hajdaraj	Miss Grand Kosovo 2021	Unable to compete		Sherif Pacolli	
2022	Edona Aliu	Miss Grand Kosovo 2022	Withdraw during the competition		Arjeta Osmani	
2023	Rinesa Murati	Appointed	Unplaced		Arjeta Osmani	
2024	Engjëllushe Zhuniqi	Runner-up Miss Universe Kosovo 2024	Unplaced		Arjeta Osmani	
2025	Brikena Selmani	Appointed	Unplaced		Arjeta Osmani	
Notes: ^{a} Resigned.; ^{b} Took over the title after the original winner resigned.

== Controversy ==
After the sash reception and welcome ceremony of the Miss Grand International 2022 pageant in Bali, the representative of Kosovo, Edona Aliu, who currently works as a model in Zürich and had previously obtained the Miss Grand national title at the Miss Universe Albania and Kosovo 2022 pageant in June, was absent from various pageant activities, including the rehearsals, sportswear competition, Balinese costume parade, as well as the swimsuit contest, but the organizers did not make an official announcement for such an incident, sparking a lot of debate on various digital platforms. The Paraguayan online newspaper, La Nación, as well as the Mexican website, Glam Star, published the media released by a Venezuelan "Jesús Hernández", who claimed the reasons for such an incident were either the winner of the contest was already elected within the first few days of the activities, or she is anti-animal cruelty and brings animals to detention, and the pageant activity that takes the candidates to the Bali Safari upsets her and causes her to withdraw, or she is tired and prefers to enjoy the vacation in Bali instead. Many Vietnamese media outlets have also reported this.

However, the pageant organizer later issued a clarification statement on October 11, citing that her health issues precluded her from participating in pageant-related events and that she withdrew from the competition three days earlier following medical advice with the organizer's approval. Meanwhile, Edona has not spoken out about the withdrawal.
