= Xhesika Berberi =

Albanian model

- Born: 27 June 1991 (age 35); Tirana, Albania
- Occupations: Model, Founder/CEO
- Modeling information
- Hair color: Blonde
- Eye color: Green

Xhesika Berberi is an Albanian model and beauty pageant titleholder, who was crowned Miss Universe Albania 2011 and represented Albania at the Miss Universe 2011.

== Career ==
Berberi was crowned Miss Universe Albania 2011 and represented Albania at the Miss Universe 2011.

Later she started her career in the United States. Berberi is one of the Albanian models that is affecting success in the American market. She is one of the images of Sherri Hill.

After the Albanian earthquake in 2019, she contributed financially to the affected families.
