= Miss Bahamas =

Beauty pageant

Miss Bahamas Organization Miss Bahamas World
- Formation: 1963
- Type: Beauty pageant
- Headquarters: Nassau
- Location: The Bahamas
- Members: Miss World; Miss Supranational
- Official language: English
- President: Michelle Malcolm
- Website: Official website

Miss Bahamas is a national Beauty pageant in the Bahamas.

== History ==
=== 1962 to 2001 (Miss Bahamas) ===
The Miss Bahamas Committee staged the Miss Bahamas Pageant for 40 years.

=== 2002-2009 (Miss Bahamas and Miss World) ===
In 2002, the franchise for the Miss Universe pageant was awarded to Theophilus Fritz and Gaynell Rolle who ran the pageant until 2009.

The Miss Bahamas Organization (MBO), which was formed in 2006, produced the Miss World Bahamas pageant since the year 2007.

=== 2010-2014 (MBO years - combined titles) ===
In 2010, the Miss Bahamas Organization (MBO) headed by journalist Michelle Malcolm was awarded the franchise for Miss Universe .

After receiving the Miss Universe franchise, MBO combined the Miss World and Miss Universe systems into one local pageant, crowning one winner who would compete in both international pageants. This was the first time in the history of pageants in the Bahamas that the license for both Miss Universe and Miss World were held by the same organization. Braneka Bassett competed in Miss Universe in 2010 and went unplaced. She then competed in Miss World that same year and advanced to the semifinals.

The following year, MBO crowned two winners - Anastagia Pierre for Miss Universe and Sasha Joyce for Miss World. Runners up were sent to Miss Supranational and Miss Intercontinental.

In 2012 due to a change in date of the Miss World pageant, Daronique Young - 1st runner up to Sasha Joyce in 2011 - represented the Bahamas at the Miss World competition where she went unplaced. Celeste Marshall was crowned Miss Universe Bahamas in 2012 and competed in Miss Universe in 2012. De'Andra Bannister was crowned Miss World Bahamas and competed in Miss World in 2013 and went unplaced.

In 2013 after undergoing a major restructuring process, MBO separated the two national pageants into separate events - Miss Universe Bahamas and Miss World Bahamas. In 2014 MBO sent Tomacina "Tomii" Culmer to Miss Universe, and this was the last time MBO would hold the Miss Universe franchise for the Bahamas.

=== 2015 to present (Miss Universe Bahamas) ===
In 2015, 2016 and 2017 the Miss Universe franchise for the Bahamas as Miss Universe Bahamas was operated by Albany Resort and Ivy Lane Ltd. Michelle Collie and Loretta Thomas were National Directors. In 2015, Toria Nichole Penn represented the Bahamas at Miss Universe, and in 2016 Cherell Williamson competed at Miss Universe. In 2017, Ivy Lane Ltd. sent Yasmine Cooke as Miss Universe Bahamas to Las Vegas to compete at Miss Universe. This would be the last time Albany Resort together with Ivy Lane Ltd. would hold the Miss Universe franchise for the Bahamas.

In 2018, the Miss Universe franchise for the Bahamas as Miss Universe Bahamas is operated by Westpoint Media Global Ltd. At the time, Westpoint Media was already producing the Miss Teen Bahamas Scholar pageant since the year 2016 and the Miss Teen Bahamas International pageant from 2012 to 2015.

Westpoint Media opted to change the name back to Miss Bahamas Universe to restore and continue to retain use of Miss Bahamas as this is the Official and National Pageant of the Bahamas with Miss Universe being the most coveted title in the worldwide pageant scene. Contestants from around the world compete for the title of Miss Universe each year.

== Westpoint Media (current franchise holder) ==
Headed by Anthony Smith, he became the National Director on June 4, 2018. PJ Michelle Douglas Sands is the Director of Pageant and Branding Affairs. The Miss Universe Bahamas Executive Board and Committee is composed of several professionals with decades of experience in pageantry, entertainment, coaching and careers in law, medicine, government, tourism, hospitality, entertainment, TV, stage and film.

== Titleholders ==
- : Declared as Winner
- : Ended as runner-up or top 5/6 qualification
- : Ended as one of the finalists or semifinalists
- : Ended as special awards winner

=== Miss Bahamas Universe ===
The main winner of Miss Bahamas was previously sending to Miss Universe pageant. Since 2018 Miss Universe Bahamas Organization took the franchise in the Bahamas.

=== Miss Bahamas World ===
The Bahamas sent the official candidates to Miss World since 1966. The Miss Bahamas World winner sends to Miss World pageant.

Year	Miss Bahamas World	Placement at Miss World	Special Awards	Notes
2021	Sienna Evans	Top 40	Top 13 Miss World Top Model; Top 28 Beauty with a Purpose	
2020	Due to the impact of COVID-19 pandemic, no pageant in 2020			
2019	Nyah Christine Barber	Unplaced		
2018	Brinique Gibson	Unplaced		
2017	Geena Alyssa Thompson	Unplaced		
2016	Ashley Bettina Hamilton	Unplaced		
2015	Chantel O'Brian	Unplaced		Later Miss Bahamas Universe 2021
2014	Rosetta Cartwright	Unplaced		
2013	De'Andra Bannister	Unplaced		
2012	Daronique Rashan Chalandra Young	Unplaced	World Designer Dress Award	Appointed ― Miss Bahamas 2010 (2nd Runner-up)
2011	Sasha Celesie Joyce	Unplaced		
2010	Braneka Constance Bassett	Top 25		
2009	Joanna Brown	Unplaced		
2008	Tinnyse Johnson	Unplaced		
2007	Anya Watkins	Unplaced		
2006	Deandrea Conliffe	Unplaced		Michelle Malcolm Directorship
2005	Ordain Moss	Unplaced		
Miss Bahamas World
2004	Brianna Clarke	Unplaced		
2003	Shantell Hall	Unplaced		
2002	T'Shura Ambrose	Unplaced		
2001	Kiara Sherman	No official Miss Bahamas 2001 titleholder for Miss World 2001 and the representative that was planned to represent the country at Miss World backed out due to lack of time and preparation and also because she wasn't an official titleholder of Bahamas.		Later Miss Bahamas Universe 2009.
2000	Latia Bowe	Unplaced		
1999	Mary Watkins	Unplaced		
1998	LeTeasha Henrietta Ingraham	Unplaced		
Miss Commonwealth Bahamas (MCB Committee)
1998	Nadia Rodgers-Albury	Did not compete		Miss Bahamas Committee lost the Miss World franchise and the new organization decided to hold a new contest thus, Nadia Rodgers-Albury did not compete at Miss World.
1997	Alveta Adderley	Unplaced		
1996	Nicole Symonette	Miss Bahamas World 1996 was still held but due to financial problems their winner, Nicole Symonette, could not compete and the committee that organized both this pageant could not send her to Miss World.		
1995	Loleta Marie Smith	Unplaced		
1994	Deanna Tamara North	Unplaced		
1993	Jacinda Saye Francis	Unplaced		
1992	Jody Barbara Weech	Top 10		
1991	Tarnia Paula Newton Stuart	Unplaced		
1990	Lisa Gizelle Strachan	Unplaced		
1989	Carolyn Moree	Unplaced		
1988	Natasha Rolle	Unplaced		
1987	Indira Regina Wood	Unplaced		
1986	Bridgette Strachan	Unplaced		
1985	Rhonda Lea Cornea	Unplaced		
1984	Yvette Monique Rolle	Unplaced		
1983	Lucille Bullen	Unplaced		
1982	Oralee Laverne Stubbs	Unplaced		
1981	Monique Ferguson	Unplaced		
1980	Bernadette Louise Cash	Unplaced		
1979	Deborah Elizabeth Major	Unplaced		
1978	Donna Marie McCook	Unplaced		
1977	Laurie Lee Joseph	Unplaced		
1976	Larona Miller	Unplaced		
1975	Ava Marilyn Burke	Unplaced		
1974	Monique Betty Cooper	Unplaced		
1973	Deborah Louise Isaacs	Unplaced		Appointed ― Miss Bahamas World 1972 (3rd Runner-up)
1972	Heather (Hedda) Cleare	Unplaced		
1971	Frances Clarkson	Unplaced		
1970	June Justina Brown	Unplaced		
1969	Wanda Pearce	Unplaced		
1968	Rose Helena Dauchot	Unplaced		
1967	Did not compete in 1967.			
1966	Dorothy Cooper	Unplaced		
Did not compete from 1951 to 1965, debuted in 1966.

== See also ==
- Mister Bahamas
- Miss Universe Bahamas
- Miss Grand Bahamas
