= Miss Universe Albania =

Beauty pageant

Miss Albania Organization
- Formation: 2006; 20 years ago
- Type: Beauty pageant
- Headquarters: Tirana
- Location: Albania
- Members: Miss Universe; Miss World
- Official language: Albanian
- Producer: Eduart Dedaj & Labinot G. Sashi
- Website: www.missuniversealbania.al

Miss Universe Albania (also known Miss Albania Organization) is a national Beauty pageant in Albania. The pageant was founded as Miss Albania in 2002, until rebranding as Miss Universe Albania in 2006.

== History ==
The beauty pageants in Albania are run by two different organizers: Vera Grabocka organized the Miss Albania competition in 1991, while Petri Bozo and his Deliart Association organize the Miss Shqiperia election. The finalists take part in the Miss Europe election, and since 2002 also for Miss World and Miss Universe.

Albanian women from Kosovo can also take part in the Miss Albania competition: Venera Mustafa became Miss Kosovo and Miss Albania in 1999. In the same year, she took part in the Miss Europe election for Albania. Agnesa Vuthaj was elected Miss Kosovo in 2003 and Miss Albania in 2004 and was a candidate for Miss World in 2004 and Miss Universe in 2005.

Miss Universe Albania was created in 2002 to determine the participants for the international Miss Universe competition.

Albania debuted at Miss Universe in 2002 with the Miss Albania organization as the official franchise holder. The organization held a national pageant yearly up to 2006. Beginning in 2007, the franchise license was given to the then-official photographer of Miss Universe, Fadil Berisha who happened to be from Albania. At this point, Fadil created the "Miss Universe Albania" organization and would hold occasional yearly national pageant or in some cases, designate a participant to represent Albania at Miss Universe. Fadil would continue to be the national director until 2013.

Since 2005, Enkeleid Omi and his agency Alba-Media have organized the competition for Miss Earth Albania (formerly Miss Shqiptarja), the winners of which take part in Miss Earth. Here too, Albanians from Kosovo have been able to stand for candidacy so far: The 2007 winner, Shpresa Vitia, comes from there

In 2014 Eduart Deda acquired the Miss Universe franchise license in Albania and in Kosovo in 2018. The company would hold yearly national pageants where two winners were crowned to compete at Miss Universe and Miss World until 2017.

=== National Directors ===
- Vera Grabocka Flloko (2002–2005)
- Fadil Berisha (2006–2011)
- Eduart Dedaj & Labinot G. Sashi (2012–present)

== Titleholders ==
Year	Miss Universe Albania	Municipality
2006	Eralda Hitaj	Tirana
2007	Sadina Alla	Tirana
2008	Matilda Mecini	Tirana
2009	Hasna Xhukiçi	Fier
2010	Angela Martini	Shkodër
2011	Xhesika Berberi	Tirana
2012	Adrola Dushi	Lezhë
2013	Fioralba Dizdari	Tirana
2014	Zhaneta Byberi	Tirana
2015	Megi Luka	Fushë-Krujë
2016	Lindita Idrizi	Elbasan
2017	Blerta Leka	Tirana
2018	Trejsi Sejdini	Elbasan
2019	Cindy Marina	Shkodër
2020	Paula Mehmetukaj	Tirana
2021	Ina Dajçi	Tirana
2022	Deta Kokomani	Durrës
2023	Endi Demneri	Tirana
2024	Françeska Rustem	Durrës
2025	Flavia Harizaj	Fier
2026	Jogersa Beqiri	Shkodër

=== Wins by municipality ===
Municipality	Titles	Years
Tirana	10	2006, 2007, 2008, 2011, 2013, 2014, 2017, 2020, 2021, 2023
Shkodër	3	2010, 2019, 2026
Fier	2	2009, 2025
Durrës	2	2022, 2024
Elbasan	2	2016, 2018
Fushë-Krujë	1	2015
Lezhë	1	2012

== Titleholders under Miss Universe Albania ==
=== Miss Universe Albania ===
- : Ended as one of the finalists or semifinalists
- : Ended as special awards winner

The main winner of Miss Albania now called Miss Universe Albania represents Albania at Miss Universe pageant. If the main winner cannot fulfill the winners's duties, the runner-up will take over.

Year	Municipality	Miss Universe Albania	Age (Note: Ages at the time of the pageant)	Placement at Miss Universe	Special awards	Notes
Eduart Dedaj directorship — a franchise holder to Miss Universe from 2012
2026	Shkodër	Jogersa Beqiri	24	TBA	TBA	
2025	Fier	Flavia Harizaj	25	Withdrew		
2024	Durrës	Franceska Rustem	19	Unplaced		
2023	Tirana	Endi Demneri	25	Unplaced		
2022	Durrës	Deta Kokomani	22	Unplaced		
2021	Tirana	Angelina "Ina" Dajci	27	Unplaced		
2020	Tirana	Paula Mehmetukaj	23	Unplaced		
2019	Shkodër	Cindy Marina	21	Top 20		Marina is an Albanian American from Temecula, California. Shkodër is her ancestral home.
2018	Elbasan	Trejsi Sejdini	18	Unplaced		
2017	Tirana	Blerta Leka	19	Unplaced		
2016	Elbasan	Lindita Idrizi	20	Unplaced	Miss Photogenic	
2015	Fushë-Krujë	Megi Luka	19	Unplaced		
2014	Tirana	Zhaneta Byberi	19	Unplaced		
2013	Tirana	Fioralba Dizdari	19	Did not compete		Bakiu did not compete at Miss Universe 2013 due to being underage and was replaced by Dizdari. But Dizdari did not compete in Miss Universe 2013 after Albania decided to withdraw from the competition, due to the host country, Russia, not allowing Kosovo to compete in the competition.
2013	Kolonjë	Kristina Bakiu	18	Did not compete		Bakiu did not compete at Miss Universe 2013 due to being underage and was replaced by Dizdari. But Dizdari did not compete in Miss Universe 2013 after Albania decided to withdraw from the competition, due to the host country, Russia, not allowing Kosovo to compete in the competition.
2012	Lezhë	Adrola Dushi	19	Unplaced		
Fadil Berisha directorship — a franchise holder to Miss Universe between 2006―2011
2011	Tirana	Xhesika Berberi	20	Unplaced		
2010	Shkodër	Angela Martini	24	Top 10		
2009	Fier	Hasna Xhukiçi	21	Top 15		
2008	Tirana	Matilda Mecini	19	Unplaced	Best National Costume (Top 10)	
2007	Tirana	Sadina Alla	18	Unplaced		
2006	Tirana	Eralda Hitaj	19	Unplaced		
Vera Grabocka Flloko directorship — a franchise holder to Miss Universe between 2002―2005
2005	Istog	Agnesa Vuthaj	19	Unplaced		Vuthaj is a Kosovan Albanian, whose hometown is in Kosovo, not Albania.
2004	Istog	Agnesa Vuthaj	18	Did not compete		
2003	Peshkopi	Denisa Kola	20	Unplaced		
2002	Tirana	Anisa Kospiri	19	Top 10		
2001	Shkodra	Gentiana Ramadani	18	Did not compete		
Did not compete between 1999—2000
1998	Burrel	Aldona Elezi	24	Did not compete		

=== Gallery of winners ===
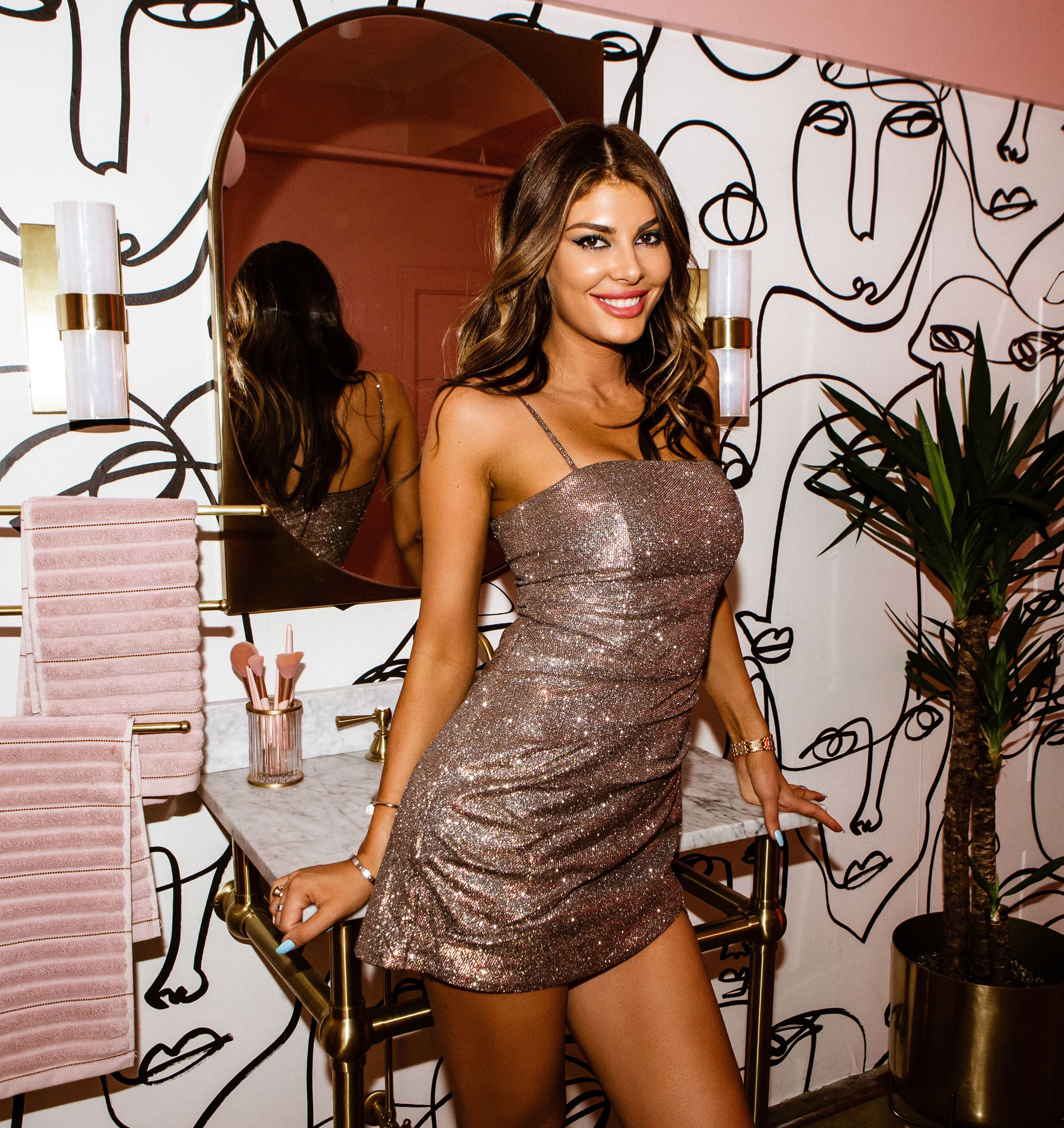
Angela Martini, Miss Universe Albania 2010

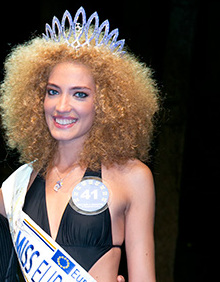
Lindita Idrizi, Miss Universe Albania 2016

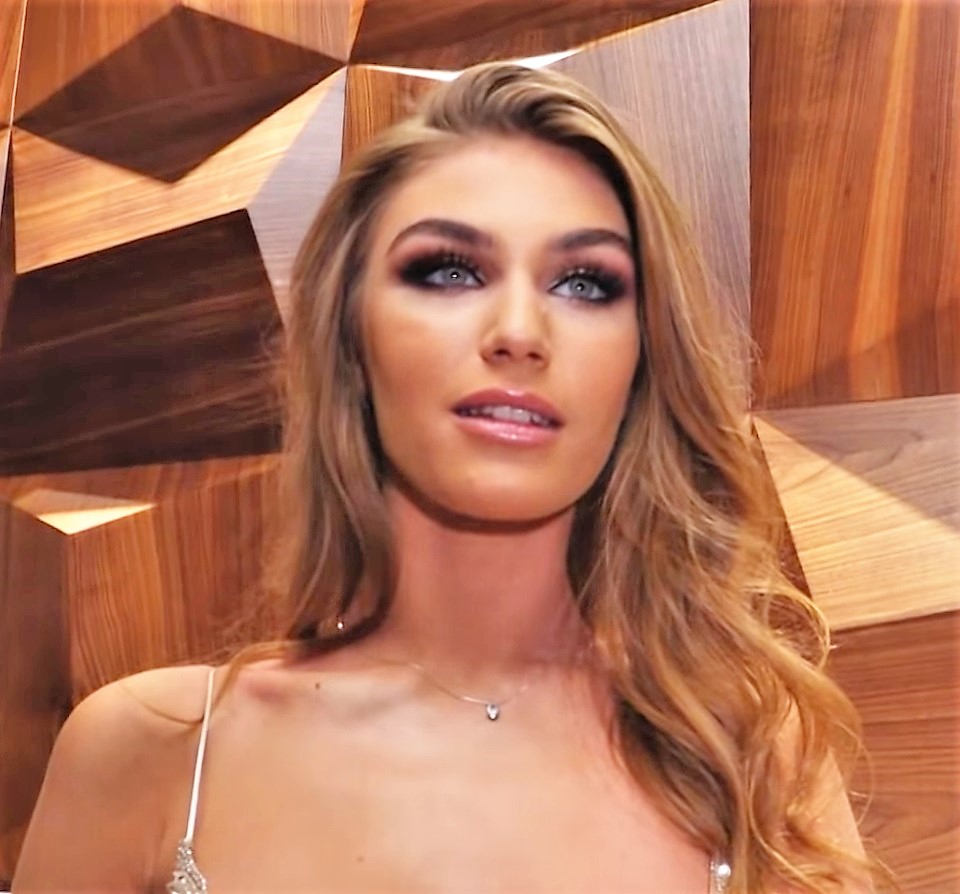
Trejsi Sejdini, Miss Universe Albania 2018

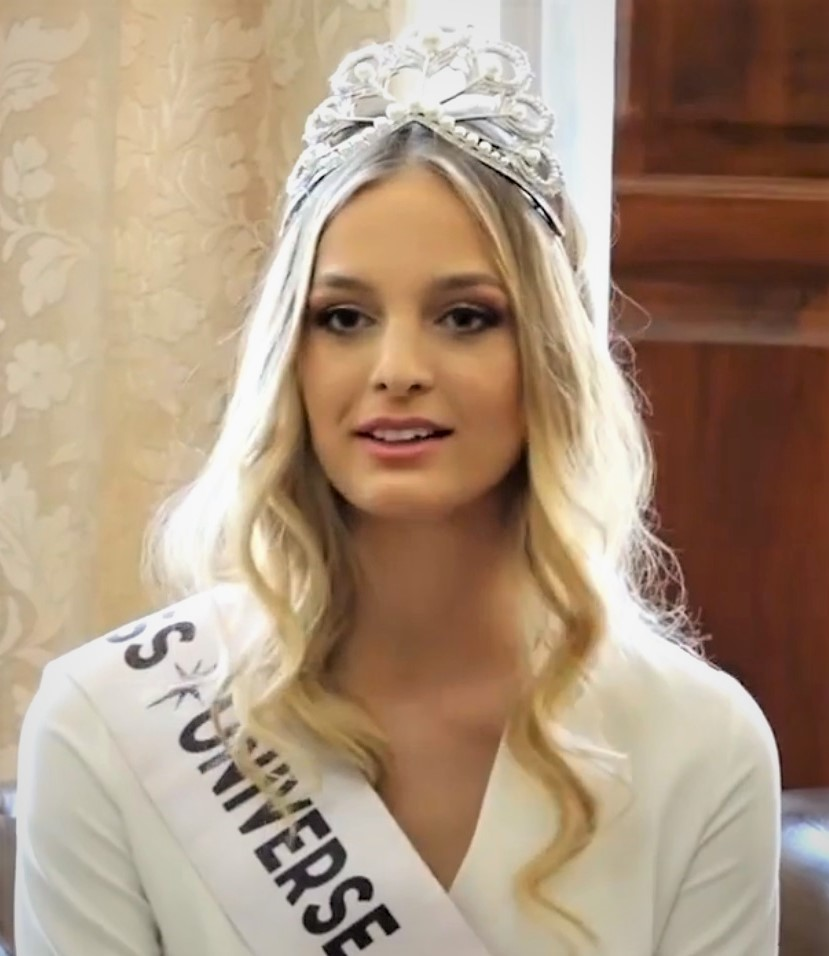
Cindy Marina, Miss Universe Albania 2019

== Other titleholders ==
=== Miss World Albania ===
The Miss Universe Albania took over the Miss World license began in 2012. The Miss World Albania has often been selected by designation process. Sometimes, a runner-up or another candidate from Miss Universe Albania will go to Miss World pageant.

Year	Municipality	Miss World Albania	Age	Placement at Miss World	Special awards	Notes
Eduart Dedaj directorship — a franchise holder to Miss World from 2013
2025	Krujë	Elona Ndrecaj	25	Unplaced		
Miss World 2023 was rescheduled to 2024 due to the change of host and when entering India as the new host, there were several issues that caused the postponement until March 2024.
2023	Krujë	Elona Ndrecaj	22	Did not compete		Miss World Albania 2022, Angela Tanuzi did not compete at Miss World. Elona Ndrecaj replaced her as the new Miss World Albania 2023. But Ndrecaj withdrew after that and she allocated to Miss World 2025.
2023	Krujë	Angela Tanuzi	20	Did not compete		Miss World Albania 2022, Angela Tanuzi did not compete at Miss World. Elona Ndrecaj replaced her as the new Miss World Albania 2023. But Ndrecaj withdrew after that and she allocated to Miss World 2025.
Miss World 2021 was rescheduled to 16 March 2022 due to the COVID-19 pandemic outbreak in Puerto Rico, no edition started in 2022.
2021	Tirana	Amela Agastra	18	Unplaced	Miss World Talent (Top 27)	Miss World Albania 2021, Joanna Kiose did not compete at Miss World. Amela Agastra replaced her as the new Miss World Albania 2021.
2021	Berat	Joanna Kiose	24	Did not compete		Miss World Albania 2021, Joanna Kiose did not compete at Miss World. Amela Agastra replaced her as the new Miss World Albania 2021.
Due to the impact of COVID-19 pandemic, no competition held in 2020
2019	Tirana	Atalanta Kërçyku	20	Unplaced		
2018	Lezhë	Nikita Preka	22	Unplaced		
2017	Fier	Joana Grabolli	20	Unplaced		
2016	Tirana	Ëndrra Kovaçi	21	Unplaced		
2015	Kolonjë	Kristina Bakiu	20	Unplaced		Kristina Bakiu was designated as Miss World Albania 2015 by the local franchisor as a replacement for Daniela Pajaziti. She won Miss Universe Albania 2013 but she was unable to compete at Miss Universe 2013 in Russia.
2015	Durrës	Daniela Pajaziti	18	Did not compete		Kristina Bakiu was designated as Miss World Albania 2015 by the local franchisor as a replacement for Daniela Pajaziti. She won Miss Universe Albania 2013 but she was unable to compete at Miss Universe 2013 in Russia.
2014	Korçë	Xhensila Pere	25	Unplaced		
2013	Tirana	Ersela Kurti	22	Unplaced		Ersela Kurti won Miss World Albania in 2012. She allocated to Miss World 2013 in Indonesia.

=== Miss Earth Albania ===
Began in 2021 Miss Universe Albania took the Miss Earth franchise and the third winner or 2nd Runner-up will be representing Albania at Miss Earth. Began 2023 the license of Miss Earth had moved on Miss Shqiperia.

Year	Municipality	Miss Earth Albania	Age	Placement at Miss Earth	Special awards	Notes
2022	Tirana	Rigelsa Cybi	25	Unplaced		
2021	Tirana	Ornella Karruku	23	Did not compete		

== See also ==
- Miss Shqipëria
