= Miss Grand Bahamas =

Beauty pageant in the Bahamas

- Formation: 2018 (As Miss Grand Bahamas pageant)
- Founder: Navado Dawkins
- Type: Beauty pageant
- Headquarters: Nassau
- Location: The Bahamas
- Members: Miss Grand International
- Official language: English; Spanish

Miss Grand Bahamas is a Nassau-based female national beauty pageant, founded by Navado Dawkins in 2018. The contest's winner represents the Bahamas internationally on the Miss Grand International stage, which was held annually since 2013. Before 2018, the country representatives at the aforementioned international contest were either appointed or determined through other national pageants, such as Miss Universe Bahamas in 2016.

Since its first participation, the Bahamian representatives got placement at the Miss Grand International pageant once in 2016, when Selvinique Wright was placed among the top 10 finalists as well as won the Best in Swimsuit award.

The pageant has no relation with a local pageant, Miss Grand Bahama, which was held annually in Bahama Island since 1970.

== History ==
Miss Grand Bahamas 2018 competition result by island groups
Color keys:

Winner 1st runner-up 2nd runner-up	3rd runner-up Unplaced Did not compete

The Bahamas took part in the Miss Grand International pageant twice in 2016 and 2017, represented by appointed beauty queens Selvinique Wright and Rejean Bosh, respectively.

The national preliminary contest in the Bahamas for Miss Grand International was first held in 2018 after Navado Dawkins, the Nassau-based designer, purchased the license. Its grand final was happening on July 1, 2018, at the Meliá Nassau Beach – All-Inclusive Resort, featuring contestants from seven island groups of the country, including Andros, Eleuthera, Exuma, Grand Bahama, Inagua, New Providence, and San Salvador, of whom, a 19-year-old international model from New Providence, Dannise Bain, was named the winner and was expected to represent the country at Miss Grand International 2018 in Myanmar. However, due to visa regulation problems, Bain was unable to participate in such an international platform. Since then, no additional national pageant has been held or any country representatives have been appointed for the Miss Grand International.

The highest achievement of the Bahamas at Miss Grand International is the top 10 finalists in the 2016 edition, won by Selvinique Wright, who also obtained the Best in Swimsuit award in the said edition. Previously, Selvinique competed as Miss Star Fish Bay in the Miss Universe Bahamas 2016 pageant, where she finished in the top 5 finalists and was then selected by such an organization to compete in Las Vegas for the 2016 Miss Grand International title.

== Edition ==
The Miss Grand Bahamas was held as a separate pageant once in 2018.

Year	Edition	Date	Final venue	Entrants	Result				Ref.
Year	Edition	Date	Final venue	Entrants	Winner	1st runner-up	2nd runner-up	3rd runner-up	Ref.
2018	1st	1 July	Meliá Nassau Beach – All-Inclusive Resort, Nassau	7	Dannise Bain (New Providence)	Sharnae Fernander (San Salvador)	Moñice Nazon (Grand Bahama)	Cornesha Colebrooke (Andros)	

== International Competition ==
The following is a list of Bahamian representatives at the Miss Grand International contest.

Year	Miss Grand Bahamas	National Title	Result		National Director	Ref.
Year	Miss Grand Bahamas	National Title	Placement	Other Awards	National Director	Ref.
2016	Selvinique Wright	Top 5 Miss Universe Bahamas 2016	Top 10	Best in Swimsuit	Tom Youth, Andy Odenbach, and Michelle Collie	
2017	Rejean Bosh	Appointed	Unplaced	—	Navado Dawkins	
2018	Dannise Bain	Miss Grand Bahamas 2018	Unable to compete		Navado Dawkins	
No representatives since 2019
Color keys for the Placements at Miss Grand International Declared as the winner Ended as a runner-up (Top 5) Ended as a finalist (Top 10) Ended as a semifinalist (Top 20/21)
