= Miss Grand Ghana =

National beauty contest in Ghana

- Formation: August 9, 2020; 6 years ago
- Founder: Sandy Amissah
- Type: Beauty pageant
- Headquarters: Accra
- Location: Ghana
- Members: Miss Grand International
- Official language: English
- National Director: Abena Appiah
- Parent organization: Akuaba Entertainment (2022 – present)
- Website: MissGrandGhana.com

Miss Grand Ghana
licensees timeline

| Stand-alone pageant |
| No titleholder/licensee |
| Appointed titleholder |

Miss Grand Ghana is a national beauty pageant for women in Ghana, established in 2020 by Legacy Pageants Limited, a pageant organization based in Accra and chaired by Sandy Amissah. The winner of the competition is designated to represent Ghana at its affiliated international pageant, Miss Grand International, while other finalists are selected to participate in various other international beauty contests. In 2022, the national license for Miss Grand Ghana was acquired by Abena Appiah, a former titleholder of Miss Grand International, who has subsequently administered the pageant on an annual basis.

Ghana has participated in the Miss Grand International pageant in the years 2015, 2018, 2022, 2023, 2024 and 2025. To date, one representative placed in the finals of the pageant, finishing third runner-up in 2025.

== History ==
Ghana began participating in the Miss Grand International pageant in 2015. Prior to the establishment of a formal national pageant in 2020, representatives were appointed to the international competition. Despite these participations, none of the appointed or later selected representatives advanced to the top twenty finalists.

The first edition of the Miss Grand Ghana pageant was organized on 9 August 2020 by Legacy Pageants Limited, under the direction of Sandy Amissah, and held at Christ the King Parish in Accra. The event was hosted by actor Achieva Evans and featured seven candidates representing seven regional divisions of the country. Pamela Clement, representing the Western Region, was crowned the winner; however, she did not participate in the Miss Grand International 2020 competition for reasons that were not publicly disclosed.

In 2022, following the acquisition of the Miss Grand Ghana franchise by Abena Appiah, titleholder of Miss Grand International 2020, the second edition of the national pageant was organized to select Ghana's representative for the international stage. Candidates were initially shortlisted through a face-to-face audition held on 17 April in Accra, after which the qualified participants were assigned to represent one of Ghana's regions. The grand final took place on 8 July at the National Theatre in Accra, featuring sixteen finalists representing sixteen regions of the country. Priscilla Bossman, representing the Central Region, was announced as the winner. In addition to the representative to Miss Grand, the other finalists were subsequently assigned to participate in other international competitions, including Miss Asia Pacific International and Queen Beauty Universe.

== Editions ==
=== Location and date ===
| Edition | Date | Final venue | Entrants | Ref. |
|---|---|---|---|---|
| 1st | 9 August 2020 | Christ the King Parish Hall, Accra | 7 | |
| 2nd | 8 July 2022 | National Theatre of Ghana, Accra | 16 | |
| 3rd | 16 August 2025 | National Theatre of Ghana, Accra | 13 | |

=== Competition result ===
| Edition | Winner | Runners-up | | | | Ref. |
| Edition | Winner | First | Second | Third | Fourth | Ref. |
|---|---|---|---|---|---|---|
| 1st | Pamela Clement (Western) | Emmanuella Aidoo (Central) | Judith Adjei (Ashanti) | Not awarded | | |
| 2nd | Priscilla Bossman (Central) | Ezta Mawutor (Volta) | Mary Animpong (Greater Accra) | Winifred Sam (Ashanti) | Giselle Fombon (Oti) | |
| 3rd | Faith Porter (Greater Accra) | Rebecca Attiogbe (Volta) | Makeeba Kaaya (Ashanti) | Not awarded | | |

== International competition ==
The following is a list of Ghanaian representatives at the Miss Grand International contest.

Color keys

- : Declared as the winner
- : Ended as a runner-up (Top 5)
- : Ended as a finalist (Top 10)
- : Ended as a semifinalist (Top 20/21)
- : Ended as special awards winner

| Year | Miss Grand Ghana | National qualification | Placement | Special Awards | National Director |
|---|---|---|---|---|---|
| 2026 | Adelaide Somuah | Appointment | TBA | | Kitava-Yvettlana Amankwah |
| 2026 | Rebecca Attiogbe | 1st Runner-up - Miss Grand Ghana 2025 | Not able to compete (Note: The original franchise holder subsequently withdrew her representation and relinquished the national license and Rebecca Attiogbe to change represent Ghana in Miss Afrikana 2026.) | | Abena Appiah |
| 2025 | Faith Maria Porter | Miss Grand Ghana 2025 | 3rd Runner-up | Grand Talent Award | Abena Appiah |
| 2024 | Sage-La’Parriea Yakubu | Appointment | Unplaced | Best in Evening Gown | Abena Appiah |
| 2023 | Kitava-Yvettlana Amankwah | Appointment | Unplaced | Grand Voice Award | Abena Appiah |
| 2022 | Priscilla Bossman | Miss Grand Ghana 2022 | Unplaced | | Abena Appiah |
Did not compete in 2021
| 2020 | Pamela Clement | Miss Grand Ghana 2020 | Did not compete | | Sandy Amissah |
Did not compete in 2019
| 2018 | Helen Demay Matey | Appointment | Unplaced | | Oklepeme Foundation |
Did not compete in 2017
| 2016 | Margaret Baa Koomson | Appointment | Did not compete | | Charlee Berbicks |
| 2015 | Charlee Berbicks | Appointment | Unplaced | | Charlee Berbicks |
| 2014 | Hanniel Jamin | Miss Universe Ghana 2013 | Did not compete | | R. Ayite Okyne |

== Gallery ==
Adelaide Somuah Twum,
Miss Grand Ghana 2026

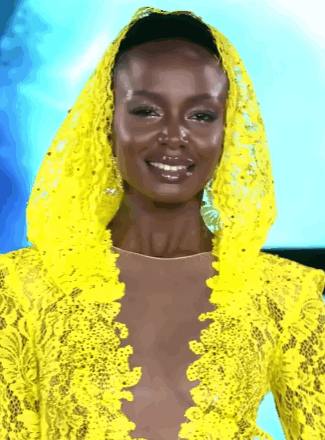
Faith Maria Porter,
Miss Grand Ghana 2025

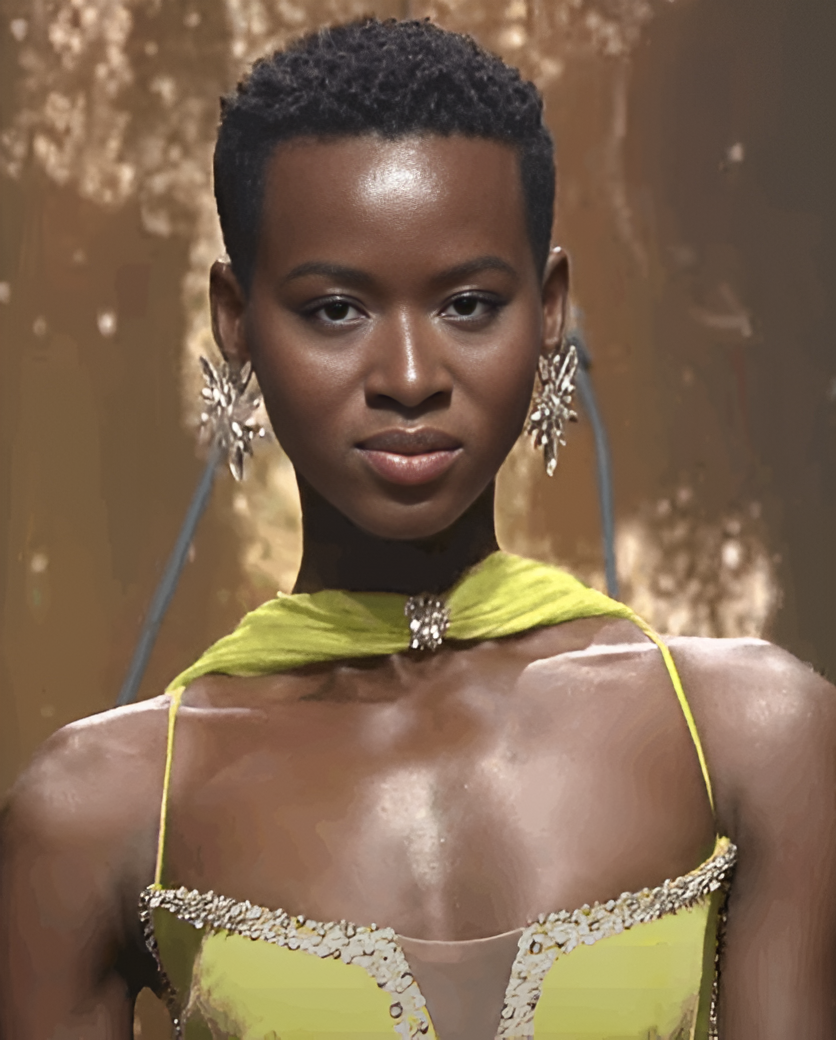
Sage-La’Parriea Yakubu,
Miss Grand Ghana 2024

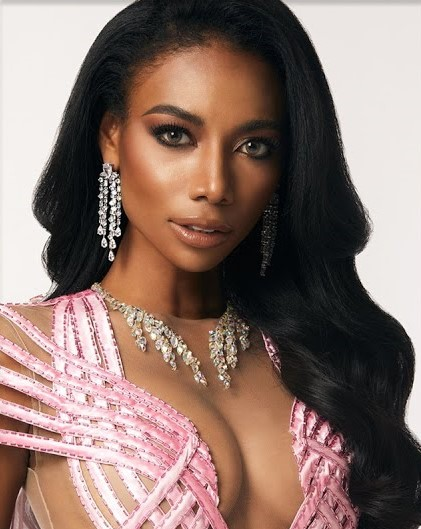
Pacharada Fusuamakawa,
Miss Grand Ghana 2023 and Pageant Director

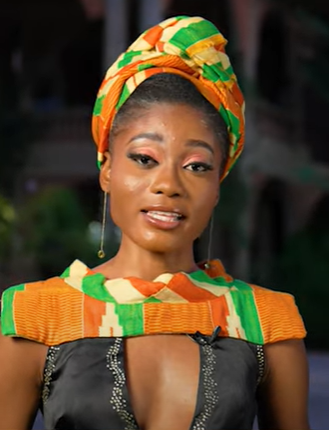
Zahara-Imani Bossman,
Miss Grand Ghana 2022

== See also ==
- Miss Ghana
- Miss Universe Ghana
- Miss International Ghana
- Miss Earth Ghana
