= Miss Grand Ghana 2022 =

2nd Miss Grand Ghana competition, beauty pageant edition

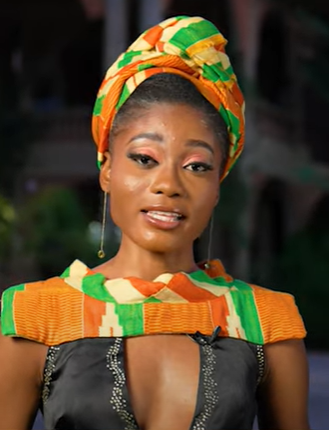
- Zahara-Imani Bossman, the winner of the contest
- Date: 8 July 2022
- Presenters: Chrys Kwame-Aryee
- Entertainment: Abena Appiah
- Venue: National Theatre of Ghana, Accra
- Broadcaster: YouTube
- Entrants: 16
- Placements: 11
- Winner: Priscilla Bossman-Pinkrah (Central Region)
- Congeniality: Priscilla Mbama Yakubu (Upper East Region)
- Photogenic: Keziah Mensima Baiden (Northern Region)

External videos
- Miss Grand Ghana 2022 Grand Final Competition, on 9 July 2022, YouTube video

Miss Grand Ghana 2022 was the second edition of the Miss Grand Ghana beauty pageant, held on 8 July 2022 at the National Theatre of Ghana in the capital Accra. As the tradition of the pageant, the winner of the contest, Priscilla Bossman of Central Region was crowned by the immediate predecessor, Miss Grand Ghana 2020 Pamela Clement, and later represented the country at Miss Grand International 2022 held in Indonesia on October 25, but went unplaced.

The contest consisted of sixteen national finalists, directly chosen by the pageant organizer through the audition round held on 17 April, each of these finalists was later assigned to represent one of the country's administrative regions regardless of their origin. One of which, the representative of Bono Region, Judith Adjei, withdrew from the pageant before moving to the final coronation night as a result of health problems.

In addition to the main winner, all runners-up in the contest will be sent to participate in other different international contests including Miss Asia Pacific International, Miss Multiverse, Miss Aura International, and Queen Beauty Universe.

== Background ==
After Ghanaian American singer and Miss Grand International 2020 titleholder, Abena Appiah, had obtained the license of Miss Grand Ghana in early 2022, she visits Ghana to set up an organizing team and then host the press conference of the 2022 Miss Grand Ghana contest in May, the competition venue and the process of selection was also stated in such.

The pageant organizer opened for online registration on 5 – 28 March, after the end of such, the number of registered candidates was reduced to 50 by the organizer's online screening, these qualified candidates later competed at the national audition round held on 17 April at the office of Exopa Burg Modeling Agency in Accra, in which the number the aspirants was additionally reduced to 16 by the panel of judges (the list of judges is shown below), then each of these sixteen candidates was assigned to represent one of the sixteen country's administrative regions throughout the competition period. The batch of final national delegates was officially revealed on 29 May.

List of Miss Grand Ghana 2022 audition judges:

- Pamela Clement, Miss Grand Ghana 2020
- Abrahim Abu Sadick, talent scout and catwalk trainer
- Josh Ansah, fitness coach and catwalk trainer
- Chrys Kwame-Aryee, TV & radio broadcaster
- Solace-Rose Quartey, broadcast journalist and anchor
- Abena Akuaba Appiah, Miss Grand Ghana national director
- Veronica Adu Nti, Miss Supranational Ghana national director

== Pageant ==
Miss Grand Ghana 2022 competition result by regions
Colors key
Winner	First runner-up
Second runner-up	Third runner-up
Fourth runner-up	Top11
Unplaced	

Prior to the final round competition, several contest sessions were held to determine the top 10 finalists who will be announced in the coronation round, such as talent competition, walking training, traditional costume contest, and the preliminary round, all such events happened during June to July.

After the completion of all such preliminary activities, the grand coronation night of the contest was held to elect the national winner at the National Theatre of Ghana in Accra on 8 July. The event started with the introduction of 16 finalists in swimwear, then the host of the event, Chrys Kwame-Aryee, announced ten finalists who qualified for the speech round, where the eligible candidates delivered their speech related to the pageant's campaign, stop the wars and violence. The panel of judges including Ghanaian actor Majid Michel, television personality Natalie Fort, and former Miss Ivory Coast, Olivia Yacé, then selected the final five candidates based on their quotes to compete in the Question and Answer portion (Q & A), after the scoring of the judges, the fourth and third runners-up were announced; the other last three candidates were additionally asked by the judges with a different question, and judges then scored each candidate based on their answer, then the second runner-up, winner and the first runner-up were respectively announced by the host at the end of the process.

However, during the grand final night, the representative of Upper West Region – Priscilla Talata Adalbilla – was announced to be one of the top 10 finalists, but she did not appear at the speech section of such round and was replaced by the representative of Ashanti Region – Winifred Sam, who later qualified to top 5 finalists and was named the third runner-up, the pageant organizer has not released any clarification statement for such an incident.

== Results ==
=== Placements ===
Color keys for international placement

- Declared as winner
- Ended as a runner-up
- Ended as a semi-finalist
- Assumed another title
- Not able to compete
- Unplaced but won at least one special award
- Unplaced

Final results	Contestant
Miss Grand Ghana 2022	Central – Priscilla Bossman
1st runner-up	Volta – Ezta Mawutor
2nd runner-up	Greater Accra – Mary Animpong
3rd runner-up	Ashanti – Winifred Sam
4th runner-up	Oti – Giselle Fombon
Top 11	North East – Miriam Ajasa; Savannah – Josephine Adjo Gokah; Upper East – Priscilla Mbama Yakubu; Upper West – Priscilla Talata Adalbilla; Western – Angela Dorla Zegblah; Western North – Mariama Musah

=== Special award ===
Award	Contestant
Miss Elegance	North East – Miriam Ajasa
Miss Congeniality	Upper East – Priscilla Mbama Yakubu
Miss Talent	Greater Accra – Mary Boaduaa Animpong
Miss Poise	Volta – Ezta Mawutor
Miss Fitness	Western – Angela Dorla Zegblah
Miss Popularity	Upper West – Priscilla Talata Adalbilla
Miss Perseverance	Ahafo – Regina Ampofowaa Darkwah
Miss Photogenic	Northern – Keziah Baaba Mensima Baiden
Miss Catwalk	Savannah – Josephine Adjo Gokah
Best Evening Gown	Bono East – Awagah Priscilla

== Candidates ==
16 delegates competed for the national title of Miss Grand Ghana 2022.

Region	Contestant	Age	Height
Ashanti	Winifred Esi Sam	20	
Ahafo	Regina Ampofowaa Darkwah		
Bono	Judith Nana Akua Oduraa Adjei		
Bono East	Awagah Priscilla		
Central	Priscilla Bossman-Pinkrah	20	
Eastern	Adelaide Somuah Twum		
Greater Accra	Mary Boaduaa Animpong		
Northern	Keziah Baaba Mensima Baiden		
North East	Miriam Ajasa		
Oti	Giselle Lum Ngu Fombon		
Savannah	Josephine Adjo Gokah		
Upper East	Priscilla Mbama Yakubu		
Upper West	Priscilla Talata Adalbilla		
Volta	Ezta Mawutor		
Western	Angela Dorla Zegblah		
Western North	Mariama Musah		
