= Mamaga Ametor Hoebuadzu II =

Paramount Queen of Alavanyo, Volta, Ghana

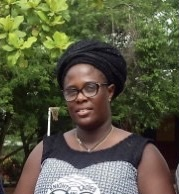
Mama Ametor Hoebuadzu

Mama Ametor Hoebuadzu II is the Paramount Queen of the Alavanyo Traditional Area in the Volta region of Ghana.

== Private life ==
She was born in Laman Kara in the Republic of Togo to Raphael Kodzo Atiboly and Mercy Yawa Sampede. In private life she is known as Barbara Peace Atiboly.

== Education and career ==
She started her secondary education at Peki Secondary School and completed at the Kpando Technical Institute, after which she began her cross-border trade between Ghana and Togo. After some years of trading, Mama Ametor enrolled in the university to continue her education. She holds a Bachelor of Science in Banking and Finance, a Master of Philosophy in Leadership and a Master of Business Administration from the University of Professional Studies. She is a member of staff of the Ministry of Gender and Social Protection, and the President of the Volta Young Queens Club, a group of queen mothers in the region who work to harmonise development in their traditional areas.

== Chieftaincy ==
Barbara Peace Atiboly was installed as queen mother of the Alavanyo traditional area on 15 January 2006 at Alavanyo Kpeme, where she was given the title Mama Ametor Hoebuadzu II. From the early days of her chieftaincy till date, she has sought to bridge the gap between tradition and culture on one hand, and contemporary opportunities for social and economic development on the other. She has organised several events and trainings with a view to address the needs of communities in Volta region, especially Alavanyo. Past events and interventions she has organised include entrepreneurship trainings, sourcing and distribution of textbooks, and delivery of hospital beds to some clinics in the Hohoe Municipality. She has also paid keen interest to well-being of women and children.

== Developmental works ==
She spearheaded the construction of a maternity and child health center in Alavanyo- Dzogbedze to provide health care services to the community, and to help reduce pregnancy related deaths and infant mortality.
