= Akpene =

Akpene can be a feminine given name or a middle name. Notable people with the name include:

- Akpene Diata Hoggar, Ghanaian model
- Dorothy Akpene Amenuke, Ghanaian sculptor, fiber artist, and educator
- Gloria Akpene Nyarku, Ghanaian media personality
