= Takyi =

Takyi is an Akan (fante tribes) surname. Notable people with the Akan surname include:

- Charles Takyi (born 1984), Ghanaian footballer
- Frances Takyi-Mensah (born 1986), Ghanaian beauty pageant winner
- Prince Nana (footballer) (born 1983), Danish-Ghanaian footballer

== See also ==
- Tacky's War, uprising of black African slaves that occurred in Jamaica in May, June and July 1760.
