= Dwomoh =

Dwomoh is an Ashanti surname. Dwomoh is a royal Ashanti surname which originated from Mampong in the Ashanti City-State. Notable people with the Ashanti surname include:

- Benjamin Dwomoh (1935–2013), Ghanaian football referee
- Irene Dwomoh (born 1986), Ghanaian beauty pageant winner
