= Miss Grand International 2020 =

8th Miss Grand International beauty pageant 2020

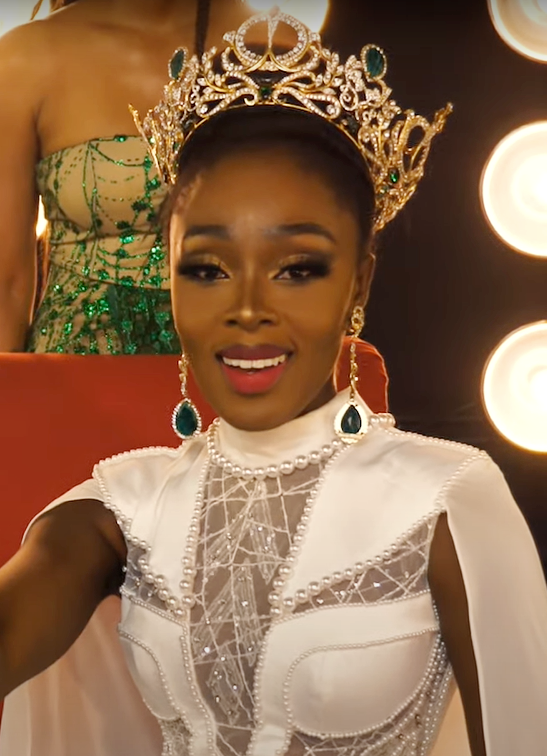
- Abena Appiah
- Date: 27 March 2021
- Presenters: Matthew Deane
- Venue: DC Hall, Bangkok, Thailand
- Broadcaster: YouTube; Facebook Live
- Entrants: 63
- Placements: 21
- Debuts: Crimea
- Withdrawals: Armenia; Australia; Curaçao; Estonia; Guadeloupe; Haiti; Latvia; Lebanon; Macau; Réunion; Romania; Ukraine
- Returns: Argentina; Cambodia; England; Finland; Iran; Jamaica; Kenya; Kosovo; Laos; Scotland; South Korea; Sri Lanka; Uruguay; Wales
- Winner: Abena Appiah; United States
- Best National Costume: Ivana Batchelor (Guatemala); Ruri Saji (Japan); Patcharaporn Chantarapadit (Thailand)
- Best in Swinsuit: Lala Guedes; Brazil
- Best Evening Gown: Angela Yuriar; Mexico

External videos
- Grand final coronation

Miss Grand International 2020 was the eighth Miss Grand International pageant, held at the DC Hall in Bangkok, Thailand, on 27 March 2021. Valentina Figuera of Venezuela crowned Abena Appiah of the United States as her successor at the end of the event. It was the first time that a black woman had won this pageant.

== Background ==
=== Location and date ===
On 25 October 2019, during the final telecast of the 8th edition of the Miss Grand International pageant in Caracas, Venezuela, the host of the event announced that the 9th edition of the contest would be held in Venezuela again on the same date next year. Later, on 17 March 2021, Nawat Itsaragrisil, the president of the organization, still insists on the original schedule, although the COVID-19 pandemic is not over yet. However, the venue might be going to change if the pandemic was further exacerbated. After the surge of COVID-19 infection from mid-2020 to early 2021 worldwide, including in Venezuela; therefore, the organization decided to postpone the pageant to 2021 and move the venue to Bangkok, Thailand instead. The official statement was released via their social media platforms on January 14, 2021, citing the grand final of the event will be held on 27 March 2021.

Originally, the organization was recommended by the Phuket Communicable Diseases Committee (CDC) to arrange the preliminary activities in Phuket, then shift to Bangkok for the main events afterward. However, the travel restrictions between the region in Thailand during the pandemic causes such an option were inconvenient for the management; after the internal investigation, the organization finally determined in favor of Bangkok to hold all the events.

The Press Conference for the pageant was taken place on 15 February 2021, in Bangkok at Show DC Hall, which was the venue for the preliminary and the final rounds. In the event, the president asserted that all candidates must arrive in Bangkok before 1 March 2021, and will be then quarantined for 14 days in the official hotel of the pageant. The aforementioned regulatory was additionally implemented for whoever wishes to attend the events, intending to prevent and control the COVID-19 pandemic. According to Thailand Coronavirus Disease 2019 Management Center (CDMC), the number of allowed attendance in each pageant indoor activity must not be more than 30 percent of the venue capacity.

The pageant was supported by the Ministry of Tourism and Sports of Thailand, aiming to promote the tourism industries in Bangkok under pandemic conditions. The pageant was officially commenced on 15 March after the 14-day-quarantined period, and consisted of four main events namely the national costume parade, the preliminary competition, and the grand final round, which was held on 24, 25, and 27 March, respectively.

=== Selection of participants ===
Of all sixty-three participating candidates, only eleven were determined through the Miss Grand national pageants, including the representatives of Albania, Brazil, Cambodia, France, Indonesia, Italy, Japan, Malaysia, Nepal, South Korea, and Thailand, while another candidates who was also elected through the Miss Grand national contest, Pamela Clement of Ghana, did not enter the international tournament for undisclosed reasons. Some countries send their other pageant's main winners to participate, namely Gabriella Jara Cordero of Costa Rica from the Finalists 2020 contest, Denisa Spergerová from Miss Czech Republic, Arlinda Prenaj from Miss From Germany, Chikaodili Nna-Udosen from The Nigerian Queen, and Ayda Mirahmadi from Miss Iran. The remaining candidates were either appointed or won Miss Grand as the supplemental title at other national pageants, such as Sara Winter of Canada who obtained the title after participating in the Miss World Canada 2020 pageant.

The original representatives from Bolivia, Cambodia, Cuba, the Czech Republic, and Peru were replaced by their runners-up or other appointed delegates due to the resignation or dethronement.

Initially, sixty-seven candidates confirmed their participation, but four of them did not enter the pageant for undisclosed reasons, including Pamela Clement of Ghana, Amber Walsh of Northern Ireland, Pearl Lazaro of Cook Islands, and Kimberly Mayoyo of Zimbabwe.

Abena Appiah of the United States won the contest, and was crowned by Valentina Figuera of Venezuela. It was the first time that a black woman had won this pageant.

== Results ==
=== Placements ===
Placement	Contestant
Miss Grand International 2020	United States – Abena Appiah
1st Runner-Up	Philippines – Samantha Bernardo
2nd Runner-Up	Guatemala – Ivana Batchelor
3rd Runner-Up	Indonesia – Aurra Kharisma
4th Runner-Up	Brazil – Lala Guedes
Top 10	Argentina – Mariana Varela; Czech Republic – Denisa Spergerová; Malaysia – Jasebel Robert §; Puerto Rico – Fabiola Valentín; Thailand – Patcharaporn Chantarapadit
Top 20	Cambodia – Chily Tevy ‡; Dominican Republic – Lady León; El Salvador – Luciana Martínez; England – Stephanie Wyatt; Japan – Ruri Saji; Kenya – Irene Ng'endo; Mexico – Angela Yuriar; Myanmar – Han Lay; Panama – Angie Keith; Peru – Maricielo Gamarra; Vietnam – Nguyễn Lê Ngọc Thảo

§ – Voted into the Top 10 by viewers and awarded as Miss Popular Vote
‡ – Voted into the Top 20 by viewers and awarded as Country's Power of the Year

=== Final Scores ===
Country/Territory	Swimsuit	Evening Gown
United States	9.73 (2)	9.75 (1)
Philippines	9.62 (5)	9.68 (3)
Guatemala	9.59 (6)	9.72 (2)
Indonesia	9.65 (4)	9.65 (4)
Brazil	9.77 (1)	9.55 (5)
Puerto Rico	9.45 (8)	9.48 (6)
Thailand	8.95 (9)	9.45 (7)
Malaysia	-	9.39 (8)
Czech Republic	9.55 (7)	9.35 (9)
Argentina	9.70 (3)	9.15 (10)
El Salvador	8.92 (10)	
Dominican Republic	8.90 (11)	
Panama	8.90 (11)	
Kenya	8.89 (13)	
Mexico	8.85 (14)	
Peru	8.85 (14)	
Vietnam	8.75 (16)	
England	8.55 (17)	
Japan	8.43 (18)	
Cambodia	7.55 (19)	
Myanmar	7.50 (20)	
Color keys: : Declared as the winner; : Ended as a 1st runner-up; : Ended as a 2nd runner-up; : Ended as a 3rd runner-up; : Ended as a 4th runner-up; : Ended as top 10; : Ended as top 20

=== Special awards ===
Award	Contestant
Best Evening Gown	Mexico – Angela Yuriar
Best in Swimsuit	Brazil – Lala Guedes
Best National Costumes	Guatemala – Ivana Batchelor; Japan – Ruri Saji; Thailand – Patcharaporn Chantarapadit
Country's Power of the Year	Cambodia – Chily Tevy
Miss Popular Vote	Malaysia – Jasebel Robert

== Pageant ==
=== In-room activities and ancillary events ===
After arriving in Thailand, each candidate has separately started a 14-day quarantine period at the hotel serving as an alternative quarantine facility in Bangkok, aiming to be the precautionary measure amidst the COVID-19 pandemic. All contestants took swab tests three times during the state quarantine; on the arrival day, day 5, and day 13. In addition, self-body temperature measurement was required twice a day. Online activities were also taken place during that period; including taking an online Thai-cooking class course with the ingredients provided by the Tourism Authority of Thailand, Thai food challenging, recording a self-induction video, as well as a live streaming chat via the official Facebook page of the pageant. Following the quarantine completed, the representatives of Ecuador, Indonesia, Mexico, Myanmar, as well as the Philippines, having a special meeting with the president of the contest on 16 March, as the honor for being on the leaderboard of the in-room online challenge.

Unfortunately, during the state quarantine with a routine COVID-19 swab test, two contestants had tested positive for COVID-19 on March 4, namely Miss Nigeria and Kenya, who were subsequently admitted to Piyavej Hospital in Bangkok for further treatment; nevertheless, the organizer has not stripped their right in the contest, while the remaining contestants all tested negative. The infected candidates were treated until testing negative on 18 March and were consequently permitted to engage in the rest activities of the contest. After the completion of the 14-day mandatory quarantine, the preliminary activities were officially inaugurated with a welcoming ceremony which took place on 16 March at the Tourism Authority of Thailand head office. The candidates also visit the Thailand Ministry of Foreign Affairs, as well as the Wat Phra Kaew, the Temple of the Emerald Buddha on 18 March.

On 21 March, the closed-door interview was performed in the official hotel, which all the candidates went through in batches of four, with the president, Vice-president Teresa Chaivisut, and reigning Miss Grand International Valentina Figuera as jurors. The score of this interview round, together with the swimsuit competition as well as the preliminary night ratings, will determine the Top 20 finalists in the grand final telecast on 27 March.

=== Swimsuit competition ===
The swimsuits competition was organized on 20 March 2021, at Lebua Hotels and Resorts at State Tower Hotel, Bangkok. After the show was completed, ten contestants were selected by public vote on the Facebook page while the other ten were chosen by the contest organizers, then narrowed down to top 10; five by voting and the rest by the panel of judges. The score for this event, together with the swimsuit round on the preliminary stage, determined the “Best in Swimsuit” recipient, which was later announced on the final telecast stage. Alaise Guedes of Brazil won the championship with the highest score of 9.77. Other finalist countries were listed below.

Placement		Contestant
Winner		Brazil – Lala Guedes
Top 10	Public Vote	Cambodia – Chily Tevy; Indonesia – Aurra Kharisma; Mexico – Angela Yuriar; Paraguay – Daisy Lezcano; Philippines – Samantha Bernardo
Top 10	Judge's Choice	Argentina – Mariana Varela; Czech Republic – Denisa Spergerová; Dominican Republic – Lady León; Kenya – Irene Ng'endo
Top 20	Public Vote	Colombia – Natalia Manrique; Ecuador – Sonia Luna Menendez; Guatemala – Ivana Batchelor; Myanmar – Han Lay; Vietnam – Nguyễn Lê Ngọc Thảo
Top 20	Judge's Choice	El Salvador – Luciana Martínez; Peru – Maricielo Gamarra; Puerto Rico – Fabiola Valentín; Thailand – Patcharaporn Chantarapadit; United States – Abena Appiah

=== National Costume Parade ===
The national costume show was done on 24 March 2021, hosted by Arthit Mekakard, Mister National Thailand 2016, and was beamed live to a virtual audience via the official YouTube channel, named GrandTV, and its Facebook Live coverage from the Show DC Hall in Bangkok. The event had no bearing on the preliminary scores. After the show, the 10 finalist costumes were classified; five by public vote and the other five by the organization. The result was announced during the final telecast on 27 March, Filipino-made Miss Japan costume, alongside the costumes of Miss Thailand and Guatemala, won the Best National Costume awards. Other finalist countries were listed below.

Placement		Contestant
Winners		Guatemala – Ivana Batchelor; Japan – Ruri Saji; Thailand – Patcharaporn Chantarapadit
Top 10	Public Vote	Cambodia – Chily Tevy; Ecuador – Sonia Luna Menendez; Indonesia – Aurra Kharisma; Philippines – Samantha Bernardo
Top 10	Judge's Choice	Malaysia – Jasebel Robert; Panama – Angie Keith; Vietnam – Nguyễn Lê Ngọc Thảo

=== Preliminary Competition ===
The preliminary round of the Miss Grand International 2020 pageant was held on March 25, 2021, at Show DC Hall, Bangkok, hosted by Arthit Mekakard. The event was beamed live stream via the official Facebook page and YouTube channel of the organizer. All 63 contestants competed in swimwear and evening gowns in front of a panel of preliminary judges. The scores from the night's event, together with a closed-door interview portion and the swimsuit competition on March 20, determine the Top 20 during the grand final telecast on 27 March.

Preliminary Selection Committee

- Nawat Itsaragrisil – President of Miss Grand International Organization
- Teresa Chaivisut – Vice president of Miss Grand International Organization
- Valentina Figuera – Miss Grand International 2019 from Venezuela
- Paul Vorapongse Dibbayawan – Chief operation officer and CEO representative of Show DC
- Komnate Nateprapai – Executive vice president TQM insurance broker Co., Ltd.
- Pichaya Pornchokborvorn – CEO representative of Nature care Co., Ltd.

=== Grand Final Competition ===
The program was scheduled to run from 7:00 p.m. until 10:30 p.m. on 27 March 2021, at Show DC Hall, Bangkok. Hosted by a Thai actor and TV host, Matthew Paul Deane, and broadcast coverage of the competition worldwide via the official social media platforms of the contest namely the GrandTV YouTube channel, and also the Miss Grand International's Facebook page. Abena Appiah of the United States was announced as the winner at the end of the event.

As the tradition of the pageant, twenty semifinalists were chosen from the initial pool of 63 delegates through a closed-door interview, swimsuit round as well as a preliminary competition, which featured contestants competing in swimsuits and evening gowns. However, the "Country of the year" was first introduced in this edition, which was selected by the audience on social networks. The challenge winner was Miss Cambodia, who automatically entered the twenty finalists regardless of all previous scores. The top 20 were then competed in a swimsuit competition, with 9 of them advancing to the Top 10 – the last spot for Top 10 candidate, Jasebel Robert of Malaysia, was determined through mobile application voting results, who then all Top 10 finalists competed in an evening gown and gave their speeches on ‘Stop the War and Violence theme’. After the speech round and evening gown competitions, the judges then selected the top five to compete in the question-and-answer portion, where all entrants were asked the same question about the ongoing COVID-19 pandemic;

With the current COVID-19 situation, what would you choose between shutting down the country for the safety of the people knowing that the country and its economy will be deeply affected, or would you open up the country to keep the economy running taking the risk of COVID-19 infections and the consequences?

All Top 5 finalists preferred to protect the people's life by shutting down the country, after the answer portion, the host consequently announced the fourth and third runners-up which were Miss Brazil and Indonesia, respectively. Later, The special question to determine the winner was performed for the remainings, namely Miss Guatemala, Philippines, and the USA;

There's only one dose of COVID-19 vaccine left. And you have to choose who to give it to either between a 15-year-old or a senior citizen of 70 years old. Who would you choose to give it to and why?

The Guatemala, as well as the US representatives, chose the 15-year-old to receive the vaccine while Miss Philippines chose the elderly patient, all with their support reasons. Finally, the United States representative, Abena Appiah, was later announced as the winner while Miss Philippines and Guatemala were named as the first and second runners-up, respectively.

Final Selection Committee

The panel of judges included five former titleholders, as follows.

- Janelee Chaparro – Miss Grand International 2013 from Puerto Rico
- Daryanne Lees – Miss Grand International 2014 from Cuba
- Ariska Pertiwi – Miss Grand International 2016 from Indonesia
- María José Lora – Miss Grand International 2017 from Peru
- Clara Sosa – Miss Grand International 2018 from Paraguay

=== Politics ===
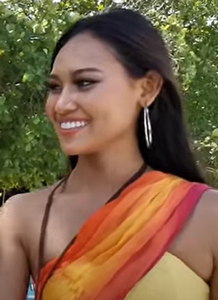
Thaw Nandar Aung, also known as Han Lay, Miss Grand Myanmar 2020

The pageant drew attention after Myanmar's contestant, Han Lay, used the final event to speak up about the atrocities being committed by the state's military. She brought to international attention, the ongoing democratic struggle following the military coup on 1 February 2021. Han Lay additionally requested the United Nations to take action against the Myanmar regime and pleaded for urgent international aid for Myanmar citizens. On the live telecast of the contest which was transmitted worldwide, Han Lay stated:

My beloved fellow citizens, it is very hard for me to be able to stand on this stage tonight. It is because of that, that you want me to speak about sadness and sorrow on behalf of them - who are currently suffering from the current situation in my beloved country, Myanmar. I am deeply sorry for the people who have lost their lives on the streets. Every citizen of the world wants prosperity in their country and a peaceful environment. In doing so, the leaders involved should not use their power and selfishness to uprise. I know some people - young women and children - risked their lives. If this situation happened somewhere, people from around the world will try to find a solution and help them.
Today, in my country Myanmar, while I'm standing on this stage, there are so many people died, more than a hundred people died today. I am deeply sorry for all the people who have lost their lives. The people from Myanmar, are working on the streets for democracy. I'm also another one who's working for democracy in the state right now. Thank you so much to the MGI Organization to give me such a great opportunity, to speak out my words, through this platform internationally. I want to say from here that, please save Myanmar! We need your urgent international help right now. Let's pray for a better world there's individual responsibility for the new generations. Make the world be at peace with Myanmar!

— Miss Grand Myanmar pleads for help for her country. Reuters. 29 March 2021. Archived from the original on 29 April 2021 – via YouTube.

Afterwards, Han Lay received threats on her social media accounts. However, the majority of comments supported her action. The Myanmar military government issued an arrest warrant for her, and she applied for refugee status and a work permit in Thailand with the support of Myanmar people working in Thailand, as well as the pageant organizer, which supporting her expenses to stay in Thailand. She eventually received political asylum in Canada in late 2021.

== Contestants ==
63 contestants competed for the title.

Country/Territory	Contestant	Age	Hometown	Ref.
Albania	Fjorela Lezo	23	Tirana	
Argentina	Mariana Varela	24	Buenos Aires	
Bashkortostan	Albina Shayk	21	Ufa	
Belarus	Polli Cannabis	25	Minsk	
Bolivia	Teresita Sánchez	20	Santa Cruz de la Sierra	
Brazil	Lala Guedes	27	Campina Grande	
Bulgaria	Viktoria Lazarova	21	Plovdiv	
Cambodia	Chily Tevy	22	Poipet	
Canada	Sara Winter	25	Duncan	
Chile	Valentina Benavente	27	Viña Del Mar	
China	Fiona Tao	28	Calgary	
Colombia	Natalia Manrique	21	Cúcuta	
Costa Rica	Gabriella Jara Cordero	22	Guácimo	
Crimea	Sofia Kim	20	Simferopol	
Cuba	Jennifer Sánchez Aguilar	20	Cienfuegos	
Czech Republic	Denisa Spergerová	20	České Budějovice	
Dominican Republic	Lady León	27	Duarte	
Ecuador	Sonia Luna Menendez	25	Guayaquil	
Egypt	Virginia Hany	19	Cairo	
El Salvador	Luciana Martínez	20	San Salvador	
England	Stephanie Wyatt	20	Poole	
Finland	Liina Malinen	21	Oslo	
France	Marine Comby	20	Martignas-sur-Jalle	
Germany	Arlinda Prenaj	25	Munich	
Guatemala	Ivana Batchelor	22	Guatemala City	
India	Simran Sharma	22	Guwahati	
Indonesia	Aurra Kharisma	20	Majalengka	
Iran	Ayda Mirahmadi	18	Saqqez	
(Republic of Ireland) Ireland	Tirna Slevin	26	Galway	
Italy	Filomena Venuso	21	Nola	
Jamaica	Monique Thomas	26	Kingston	
Japan	Ruri Saji	25	Saga	
Kenya	Irene Ng'endo	22	Juja	
Kosovo	Frontina Gashi	24	Pristina	
Laos	Phatthana Khidaphone	20	Vientiane	
Malaysia	Jasebel Robert	25	Kuala Lumpur	
Mauritius	Vishakha Tania René	23	Port Louis	
Mexico	Angela Yuriar	19	Culiacan	
Myanmar	Han Lay	22	Mawlamyine	
Nepal	Ambika Joshi Rana	21	Kathmandu	
Netherlands	Suzan Lips	27	Berkel-Enschot	
Nicaragua	Teresa Moreno	28	León	
Nigeria	Chikaodili Nna-Udosen	26	Onitsha	
Panama	Angie Keith	26	Panama City	
Paraguay	Daisy Lezcano	27	San Lorenzo	
Peru	Maricielo Gamarra	25	San Martín	
Philippines	Samantha Bernardo	27	Puerto Princesa	
Poland	Milena Sadowska	22	Balice	
Portugal	Sarah Duque	27	Porto	
Puerto Rico	Fabiola Valentín	21	Camuy	
Russia	Guzel Musina	23	Kazan	
Scotland	Helen Maher	26	Coleraine	
South Africa	Anrónet Roelofsz	26	Pretoria	
South Korea	Hyun-young Lee	24	Seoul	
Spain	Iris Miguélez	22	Galicia	
Sri Lanka	Prathibha Liyanaarachchi	21	Colombo	
Sweden	Felicia Brunzell	24	Hudiksvall	
Thailand	Patcharaporn Chantarapadit	22	Songkhla	
United States	Abena Appiah	27	Accra	
Uruguay	Jimena Martino	25	Canelones	
Venezuela	Eliana Roa	24	Caracas	
Vietnam	Nguyễn Lê Ngọc Thảo	25	Ho Chi Minh City	
Wales	Kathryn Fanshawe	23	Surrey	

== Controversy ==
Previously, the pageant was scheduled to be held in Venezuela on 25 October 2020, however, due to the COVID-19 pandemic, the organization decided to postpone the event to 2021 and move the venue to Bangkok, Thailand. After arriving in Thailand, each contestant had to quarantine in the country for two weeks before taking part in the pageant, following Thailand's public health measures aiming to prevent and control the pandemic. The further examination found two contestants had tested positive for COVID-19 during the quarantine period. Both were subsequently treated in the hospital until testing negative and were permitted to participate in the remaining activities of the pageant.

The grand final of the pageant was hosted by Matthew Deane, and featured 63 contestants. In addition to crowning the winner, the representative of Myanmar, Han Lay, also took the stage during the final telecast to make a declaration against alleged atrocities committed by Myanmar's military in her home country and pleaded for urgent international aid amid the ongoing bloodshed. Her statement caused the Myanmar military government to issue an arrest warrant against her, leading her to apply for refugee asylum in Thailand with the support of the pageant organizer, and she eventually immigrated to Canada for political asylum in late 2021.
