= Miss Grand International 2019 =

7th Miss Grand International competition, beauty pageant edition

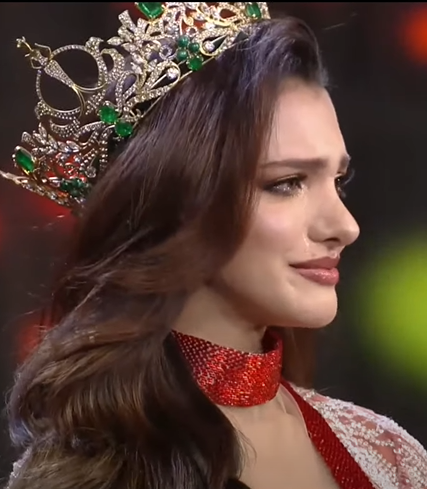
- Valentina Figuera
- Date: 25 October 2019
- Presenters: Leo Aldana; Clara Sosa
- Venue: Poliedro de Caracas, Caracas, Venezuela
- Broadcaster: Televen; YouTube
- Entrants: 60
- Placements: 21
- Debuts: Armenia; Bashkortostan; Ireland; Réunion
- Withdrawals: Argentina; Belgium; Cambodia; Cape Verde; Cook Islands; Denmark; England; Ethiopia; Finland; Ghana; Hong Kong; Jamaica; Kazakhstan; Kosovo; Laos; Moldova; Mongolia; New Zealand; Norway; Scotland; Sierra Leone; South Korea; Sri Lanka; Suriname; Taiwan; Tanzania; Tatarstan; United States Virgin Islands; Wales; Zambia
- Returns: Belarus; Curaçao; Egypt; France; Guatemala; Italy; Latvia; Mauritius; Nicaragua; Nigeria; Romania
- Winner: Valentina Figuera; Venezuela
- Best National Costume: Mara Topić; Ecuador
- Best in Swimsuit: Carmen Drayton; Panama
- Best Evening Gown: Camila Escribens; Peru

Miss Grand International 2019 was the seventh Miss Grand International pageant, held at the Poliedro de Caracas in Caracas, Venezuela, on 25 October 2019.

Clara Sosa of Paraguay crowned Valentina Figuera of Venezuela as her successor at the end of the event. This was the first time that the host country delegate won the crown.

== Background ==
=== Location ===
On 15 March 2019, the Miss Grand International Organization announced that the competition would be held on 25 May 2019, at Poliedro de Caracas in Caracas, Venezuela.

=== Selection of participants ===
Delegates representing 60 countries and territories were selected to compete in the pageant; three of these delegates were appointed to their titles after an audition process or other internal selection (Cuba, Germany, and Mauritius), two contestants were designated after the withdrawal of the original contestant. Génesis Quintero, who had been crowned "Miss Grand Colombia 2019", was appointed to represent Colombia after Sthefani Rodríguez, the former titleholder, has presented her letter of resignation to the national director Luis Garcés citing personal reasons. Previously, Quintero was the winner of Miss Grand Colombia 2018 but she renounced her title without competing in the international event. Sudawan Kumdee was appointed to the title "Miss Grand Ireland 2019" by the country's national director Manuel Munares after Hollie Hersey, the original titleholder, handed back the national title after being body-shamed by the director. Nine of the total delegates were appointed to their titles without participating in any respective national pageants, including Belarus, Canada, Dominican Republic, Egypt, Estonia, Guatemala, Nicaragua, Latvia, and Romania.

Eight winners or runner-ups of previous years national pageants were appointed to their national titles, including; Galina Lukina of Bashkortostan, was designated to represent the territory by Luiza Zakiryanova, the director of Miss Bashkortostan. Previously, Lukina had been crowned Miss Bashkortostan 2016, Miss Bikini CIS 2015, as well as the ambassador of peace between Bashkortostan and South Korea. Brenda Castro was appointed to represent Costa Rica by Gerson Jiménez, the director of a newly established reality show pageant "The Finalists", after the Miss Costa Rica organization relinquished the franchise. Castro had been crowned Miss Costa Rica 2015. The Reina de El Salvador 2018, Olga Ortiz, was appointed to participate in the contest by Francisco Cortez, the director of El Certamen Nacional de la belleza El Salvador. Ortiz had previously represented El Salvador at Miss Asia Pacific International 2018 The Netherlands representative, Margaretha de Jong, who has been crowned Miss Beauty of Netherlands 2018 and represented the country at Miss Earth 2018, was appointed to the title by the organization "12 Months of Beauty", the owner of the Netherlands franchise for Miss Grand International. Kamilla Khusainova was designated to represent Russia by "The Volga Model", the organizer of the contest Miss Tourism of Russia. Khusainova was Miss Tatarstan 2018, Miss Tourism Russia 2018, and the winner of an international contest Miss Aura International 2018. Liana Sargsyan, a representative from Armenia who went unplace at Miss World 2017. she was appointed by the national director Janna Gregory, making her the first Armenian delegate participating since the establishment of the contest. Sargsyan had been crowned Miss Armenia 2017. The last three candidates who were appointed to enter the contest was Patrycja Woźniak, the second runner-up Miss Polonia 2018, Nahémy Ceriac, the first runner-up Miss Guadeloupe 2016, and Stephanie Karam, Miss International Lebanon 2016. The remainder of the delegates were selected after winning their respective national pageants, obtaining the runner-up, or receiving a designated supplementary title at a national pageant.

Due to visa issues and security concerns in Venezuela, ten countries decided to withdraw from the competition, including: Cambodia, Denmark, England, Jamaica, Laos, New Zealand, Scotland, South Korea, Wales, and Zambia. Park Serim, who had been crowned Miss Grand Korea 2019, was expected to represent South Korea at the competition. However, due to the deteriorating political situation and safety, the whole area of Venezuela is stated as the "Red Travel Warning Area" by South Korea's Ministry of Foreign Affairs. The Miss Grand Korea organization was strongly suggested and warned not to visit Venezuela unless the purpose of the trip is crucial and essential by the Ministry, making the country's delegate was unable to participate in the pageant. The organization has decided to send the winner to instead compete at the Miss Global 2019. Moreover, Luwi Lusa Kawanda, the representative of Zambia, as well as all three candidates from United Kingdom, also decided to withdraw from the competition and chose to instead participate in Miss International 2019 and Miss Global 2019, recpectively. The rest of withdrawal countries were lack of national franchise owners.

=== Crown and jewelry ===
A new crown created by Venezuelan jewelry designer George Wittels, the official jewelry sponsor of the Miss Grand International Organization. The pageant was broadcast on Televen, hosted by Venezuelan TV host Leo Aldana and Miss Grand International 2018 Clara Sosa.

=== 2020 Host country ===
At the end of the final event, the host had announced that the 8th Miss Grand International would take place in Venezuela again in October 2020 but due to the COVID-19 pandemic, the organization decided to postpone the pageant to 2021 and moved the venue to Bangkok, Thailand instead.

== Results ==
=== Placements ===
| Placement | Contestant |
|---|---|
| Miss Grand International 2019 | Venezuela – Valentina Figuera |
| 1st runner-up | Mexico – María Malo |
| 2nd runner-up | Thailand – Arayha Suparurk |
| 3rd runner-up | Panama – Carmen Drayton |
| 4th runner-up | Brazil – Marjorie Marcelle |
| Top 10 | Australia – Taylor Marlene Curry; Ecuador – Mara Topić; Peru – Camila Escribens; Puerto Rico – Hazel Ortíz; Vietnam – Nguyễn Hà Kiều Loan § |
| Top 20 | Chile – Francisca Lavandero; Colombia – Génesis Quintero; Costa Rica – Brenda Castro; Czech Republic – Maria Boichenko; Dominican Republic – Stéphanie Bustamante; Guatemala – Dannia Guevara; Ireland – Sudawan Kumdee; Japan – Adeline Minatoya; Paraguay – Milena Rodríguez; South Africa – Belindé Schreuder; Spain – Ainara de Santamaría |

§ – Voted into the Top 10 by viewers and awarded as Miss Popular Vote

== Pageant ==
=== Format ===
As in all previous editions, twenty semifinalists were chosen from the initial pool of 60 delegates through a closed-door interview and a preliminary competition — in swimwear and evening gown—held two days before the finals night. The top 20 then competed in the swimsuit competition, with 9 of them advancing to the Top 10 – the last spot for Top 10 candidate, Nguyễn Hà Kiều Loan of Vietnam, was determined through online voting results, then all Top 10 finalists competed in the evening gown competition and gave their speeches on ‘Stop the War and Violence theme’. After the speech round and evening gown competitions, the judges then selected the top five to where they would then compete in the question-and-answer portion, where all contestants were asked the same question about the ongoing crisis in Venezuela, after which the judges chose Miss Grand International 2019 and her four runners-up.

=== Selection committee ===
==== Preliminary competition ====
- Nawat Itsaragrisil – President of Miss Grand International.
- Teresa Chaivisut – Vice-president of Miss Grand International.
- Leudys González – CEO of Nuestra Tierra Foundation
- George Wittels – Jewelry and crown designer.
- Pedro Durán – Entrepreneur and singer.

== Contestants ==
60 contestants competed for the title.

| Country/Territory | Contestants | Age | Hometown |
|---|---|---|---|
| Albania | Xhensila Shaba | 23 | Tirana |
| Armenia | Lily Sargsyan | 19 | Yerevan |
| Australia | Taylor Marlene Curry | 24 | Gold Coast |
| Bashkortostan | Galina Lukina | 27 | Ufá |
| Belarus | Karina Kiseleva | 22 | Minsk |
| Bolivia | Carolina Paz Rojas | 19 | Cochabamba |
| Brazil | Marjorie Marcelle | 24 | São Paulo |
| Bulgaria | Victoria Vaseva | 25 | Sofia |
| Canada | Brianna Plouffe | 20 | Cowansville |
| Chile | Francisca Lavandero | 19 | Los Ángeles |
| China | Deng Jiefang | 20 | Shanxi |
| Colombia | Génesis Quintero | 27 | Arauca |
| Costa Rica | Brenda Castro | 27 | Guápiles |
| Cuba | Elaine González | 25 | La Habana |
| Curaçao | Liane Bonofacia | 27 | Willemstad |
| Czech Republic | Maria Boichenko | 23 | Praga |
| Dominican Republic | Stéphanie Bustamante | 27 | Paterson |
| Ecuador | Mara Topić | 25 | Los Angeles |
| Egypt | Esraa Albelasi | 26 | Cairo |
| El Salvador | Olga Ortiz | 25 | Usulután |
| Estonia | Eliise Randmaa | 19 | Tallinn |
| France | Cassandra De Sousa | 25 | Dreux |
| Germany | Lalaine Mahler | 19 | Swabia |
| Guadeloupe | Nahémy Ceriac | 22 | Les Abymes |
| Guatemala | Dannia Guevara | 22 | San Marcos |
| Haiti | Josée Isabelle Riché | 26 | Puerto Príncipe |
| India | Shivani Jadhav | 23 | Raipur |
| Indonesia | Sarlin Delee Jones | 18 | Kupang |
| Ireland | Sudawan Kumdee | 26 | Dublin |
| Italy | Mirea Sorrentino | 22 | Pompeya |
| Japan | Adeline Minatoya | 26 | Nagano |
| Latvia | Kate Alexeeva | 24 | Riga |
| Lebanon | Stephanie Karam | 26 | Mexico City |
| Macao | Loi Chi Ian | 27 | Macau |
| Malaysia | Mel Dequanne Abar | 20 | Kota Kinabalu |
| Mauritius | Shanone Savatheama | 21 | Port Louis |
| Mexico | María Malo | 22 | Huixquilucan |
| Myanmar | Hmwe Thet Lwin | 25 | Myeik |
| Nepal | Nisha Pathak | 22 | Kathmandu |
| Netherlands | Margaretha de Jong | 22 | Jistrum |
| Nicaragua | Vanessa Baldizón | 22 | León |
| Nigeria | Favour Ocheche | 20 | Oturkpo |
| Panama | Carmen Drayton | 23 | Colón |
| Paraguay | Milena Rodríguez | 20 | Encarnación |
| Peru | Camila Escribens | 21 | Long Beach |
| Philippines | Samantha Ashley Lo | 26 | Cebu City |
| Poland | Patrycja Woźniak | 20 | Łódź |
| Portugal | Laura Gameiro | 23 | Paris |
| Puerto Rico | Hazel Ortíz | 22 | Morovis |
| Réunion | Laëtitia Hoareau-Boyer | 25 | Terre Sainte |
| Romania | Ramona Vatamanu | 27 | București |
| Russia | Kamilla Khusainova | 21 | Kazan |
| South Africa | Belindé Schreuder | 23 | Centurion |
| Spain | Ainara de Santamaría | 23 | Argoños |
| Sweden | Clara Wahlqvist | 20 | Tormestorp |
| Thailand | Arayha Suparurk | 25 | Pathum Thani |
| Ukraine | Viktoriya Myronova | 24 | Odesa |
| United States | Emily Delgado | 24 | Las Vegas |
| Venezuela | Valentina Figuera | 19 | Puerto La Cruz |
| Vietnam | Nguyễn Hà Kiều Loan | 19 | Quảng Nam |

=== Withdrawals ===
- Ashleigh Wild who was crowned Miss Grand England 2019, and Freya Taylor who was elected Miss Grand Scotland 2019, withdrew, due to the socioeconomic and political crisis in Venezuela.
- Emma May Gribs was set to represent New Zealand at the pageant but has withdrew over the socioeconomic and political crisis in Venezuela. She instead competed at Miss Tourism International in Malaysia.
- Ramatulai Wurie was appointed as Miss Grand Sierra Leone 2019 by the president of Face of Sierra Leone contest Swadu Natasha Beckley, but she did not compete for unknown reasons.

=== Substitutions ===
- Hollie Hersey, a former Miss Grand Ireland 2019, resigned her right to participate in international competitions after a fallout about a body shaming issue with Manuel Munares, director of the Miss Grand International franchise in Ireland. The new representative was Sudawan Kumdee, a Thai-born Irishwoman from Dublin. Kumdee also competed at Miss Grand Thailand 2019, representing the province of Chaiyaphum.

=== Designations ===
- Brianna Plouffe was appointed to represent the country in Miss Grand International after the Miss World Canada organization took over the franchise.
- Brenda Castro was appointed by Gerson Jiménez, the new national director of Miss Grand Costa Rica, Castro was Miss Costa Rica 2015.
- Josée Isabelle Riché was appointed as Miss Grand Haiti 2019 after becoming first runner-up at Miss Haiti Caraibes 2019.
- Shanone Savatheama was appointed as Miss Grand Mauritius 2019 by Ahmad Abbas Mamode, the new owner of the Mauritius franchise for Miss Grand International.
