= Hilda Akua Frimpong =

Ghanaian model

- Born: Hilda Akua Frimpong; 1991 (age 34–35); Kumasi, Ghana
- Education: Texas A&M University
- Height: 1.73 m (5 ft 8 in)
- Beauty pageant titleholder
- Title: Miss Ghana USA 2012; Miss Universe Ghana 2015
- Hair color: Black
- Eye color: Black
- Major competitions: Miss Ghana USA 2012 (Winner); Miss Africa USA 2014 (2nd Runner-up); Miss Universe Ghana 2015 (Winner); Miss Universe 2015 (Unplaced)

Hilda Akua Frimpong (born 1991) is a Ghanaian model and beauty pageant titleholder who was crowned Miss Universe Ghana in 2015 and represented Ghana at the Miss Universe 2015 pageant. After being diagnosed with scoliosis in 2012, Frimpong became a health activist and advocate on prevention and treatment of the condition. In 2021 whilst studying at the Syracuse University College of Law, she was named as the new editor-in-chief of the Syracuse Law Review, making her the first Black person to occupy the position.

== Early life and education ==
Frimpong hails from Kumasi the capital city of the Ashanti Region of Ghana, where she was also raised. In 2012, she was diagnosed with scoliosis. Her condition triggered her to advocate people on prevention and treatment of the medical condition. She has a Bachelor of Arts in anthropology at Texas A&M University, United States.

Frimpong is currently a law student at the Syracuse University College of Law. In March 2021, she was named as the new editor-in-chief of the Syracuse Law Review, making her the first Black person to occupy the position. Frimpong would be leading the Syracuse Law Review for the 2021–22 academic year with a majority-female board.

== Career ==
Frimpong is a humanitarian and philanthropist in Ghana. She is also a founder of the Straight UP! Scoliosis charity. Currently, she works as a Regional Developer for Hay Group. At Syracuse University, she serves in other roles including as a volunteer for the Cold Case Justice Initiative, a criminal law tutor, a research assistant, and an ambassador for the Office of Admissions.

== Pageantry ==
=== Miss Ghana USA 2012 ===
In 2012, she became Miss Ghana USA 2012 and placed as 2nd runner-up at the annual Miss Africa USA 2014 pageant.

=== Miss Universe Ghana 2015 ===
On August 29, 2015, Akua was crowned Miss Universe Ghana at Alisa Hotel Accra. As Miss Universe Ghana 2015, she competed at the Miss Universe 2015 pageant.

Awards and achievements
Preceded by Abena Appiah	Miss Universe Ghana; 2015	Succeeded by Ruth Quarshie
