= Monica Amekoafia =

Winner of first Miss Ghana edition

- Born: 30 June 1934; Alavanyo, Gold Coast
- Died: 24 June 1990 (aged 55)
- Other names: Mrs. Monica Marrah
- Known for: First Miss Ghana Beauty Pageant Winner in 1957

Monica Amekoafia (30 June 1934 – 24 June 1990) was a Ghanaian and the winner of the first edition of the Miss Ghana contest in 1957 while representing the Trans-Volta Togoland. She was contestant Number 9. It was from her number that people from the Volta Region are called Number 9.

She was born to Augustus Amekoafia and Anastasia Apau in June 1934 at Alavanyo in the Trans-Volta Togoland in the Gold Coast. She later married a Ghanaian diplomat, Henry Kofi Marrah in London, United Kingdom. At the time of the marriage, Monica had two sons from a previous relationship. Between them they had four children. Following the appointment of her husband as Ambassador to Czechoslovakia in 1961, the Marrah family moved to Prague that year. In 1963 Monica's husband was posted to Hungary where she and her family lived until 1966. Following the coup d'état that replaced the Nkrumah government with the military National Liberation Council on 24 February 1966, she returned to Ghana with her family. Monica settled down to life in Ghana where though basically a housewife, she engaged in different trades working from home. Her primary trade being dressmaking, she also engaged in the tie and dye business and soap making among others.

Her husband, Henry who had gone into private business after his diplomatic career, died in September 1985. Monica died from an asthma attack on 24 June 1990.

A statue was also unveiled in her honour at Hohoe in the Volta Region of Ghana.
