= Erica Nego =

American beauty queen, model and businesswoman

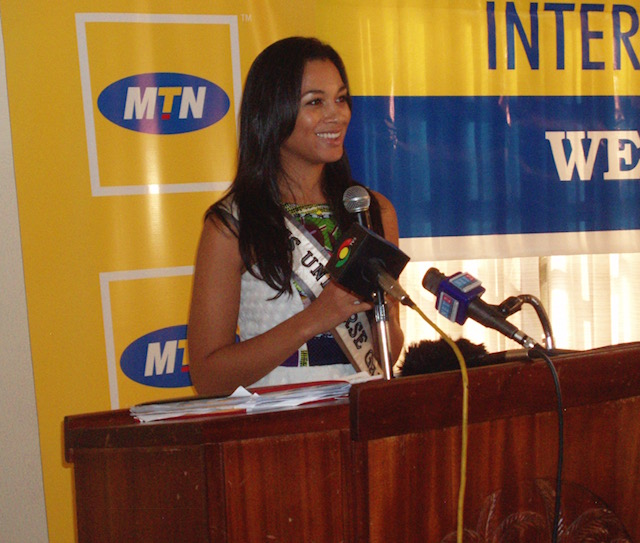
- Born: c. 1984; Minneapolis, Minnesota, U.S.
- Other names: Yayra Nego
- Citizenship: America; Ghana
- Known for: Miss Minnesota USA 2009 (Winner); Miss USA 2009 (Top 15); Miss Universe Ghana 2011 (Winner); Miss Universe 2011 (Unplaced)
- Children: Ghanaian (Ghana)

Erica Yayra Nego (born c. 1984 in Minneapolis, Minnesota) is an American-Ghanaian businesswoman, model and beauty pageant titleholder. She was elected Miss Minnesota USA 2009 and Miss Universe Ghana 2011,

Nego is the co-founder of Style & Grace, a Minneapolis-based etiquette academy.

== Early life ==
Nego was born in about 1984 in Minneapolis, Minnesota. At the age of 12, she was signed to Ford Modeling Agency. She is of Ghanaian, German and Persian ancestry.

== Pageants ==
As Miss Minnesota USA 2009, Nego competed at Miss USA 2009 placing in the top 15 at the competition. She also competed at Miss Universe 2011 in São Paulo, Brazil on September 12, 2011.

== In popular culture ==
The play School Girls; Or, the African Mean Girls Play by Jocelyn Bioh was inspired by the 2011 Miss Universe Ghana competition in which Nego participated, and the controversy around colorism that this contest sparked.
