= Kate Tachie-Menson =

Ghanaian model

- Born: 1985 (age 40-41); Accra, Ghana
- Modeling information
- Height: 1.79 m (5 ft 10 1/2 in)
- Agency: O Model Africa; Shine Group Model Agency (Cape Town); Zone Models (London); Muse Management (New York)

Kate Tachie-Menson is a Ghanaian model. In 2008, she became the seventh and first Ghanaian to win M-Net's Face of Africa competition in South Africa.

== Career ==
In 2006, she auditioned and is one of the 13 contestants to competed on Top Model Ghana on GTV, where she reached the final and finished in Top 6 overall.

Also in 2006, she auditioned for M-Net's Face of Africa but did not qualify. However, in 2008, she qualified and was crowned the winner, becoming the seventh M-Net Face of Africa and received her prizes include a three-year modelling contract with O Model Africa and a cash prize of US$50,000.

Subsequently, Tachie-Menson has starred in fashion shows including Ready to wear – Autumn/Winter 2009, Ready to wear – Autumn/Winter 2011, Mercedes-Benz Fashion Week in South Africa, New York and New Delhi fashion week. She has been on magazine covers including Mimi Magazine in Ghana and Canoe Magazine in UK. She as well shot editorials for Elle, Glamour and Cosmopolitan.
