= Miss Grand Bashkortostan =

Russian beauty pageant title

- Formation: 2019
- Type: Beauty pageant
- Headquarters: Ufa
- Location: Russia
- Members: Miss Grand International
- Official language: Russian
- National director: Luiza Zakiryanova
- Parent organization: Miss Bash Models (2019 – 2020)

Miss Grand Bashkortostan is a female beauty pageant title awarded to Bashkir representatives competing in the Miss Grand International contest. From 2019 to 2020, the franchise of Miss Grand International for Bashkortostan belonged to a model agency, Miss Bash Models, which was managed by Luiza Zakiryanova.

The first Bashkir at Miss Grand International was a former Miss Bashkortostan 2016 from Ufa, Galina Lukina, assigned in 2019; however, Galina didn't place at the Miss Grand International 2019 semifinals held in Venezuela. Later in 2020, the winner of Miss Bashkortostan 2020, Albina Shaykhlislamova, was assigned by the same agency to partake in the 2020 edition of Miss Grand International in Thailand, but Albina was also unplaced. Albina was the last Bashkir representative to compete in Miss Grand International.

== International competition ==
The following is a list of Bashkir representatives at the Miss Grand International contest.

Year	Representative	Original national title	Result	National director
2019	Galina Lukina Галина Лукина	Miss Bashkortostan 2016	Unplaced	Luiza Zakiryanova
2020	Albina Shaykhlislamova Альбина Шайхлисламова	Miss Bashkortostan 2020	Unplaced	Luiza Zakiryanova
No representatives since 2021
