= Syracuse Law Review =

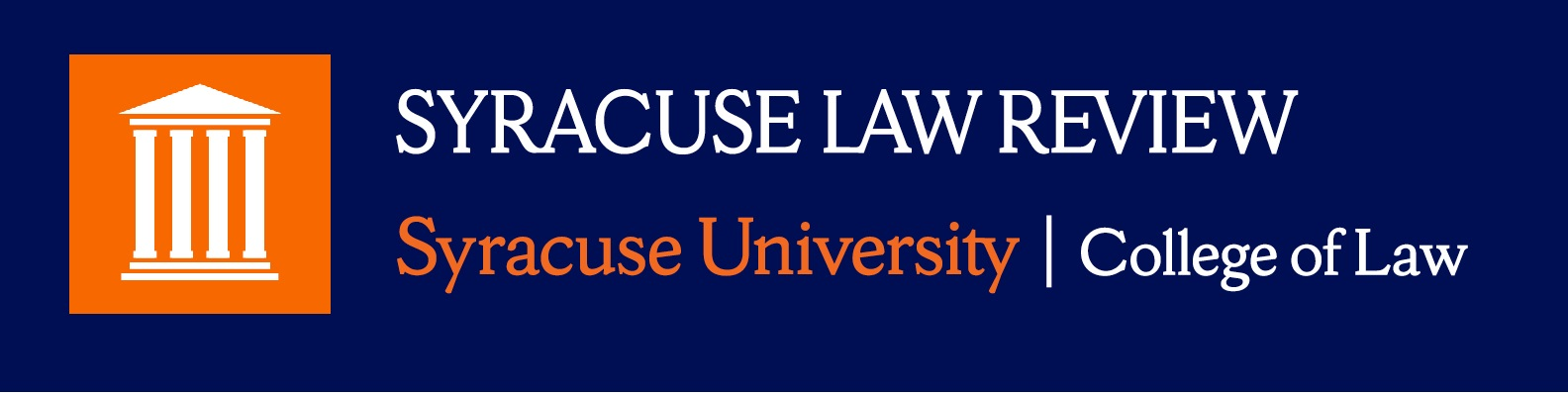
- Discipline: Law review
- Language: English

Publication details
- History: 1949–present
- Publisher: Syracuse University College of Law (United States)
- Frequency: Triannually

Standard abbreviations
- Bluebook: Syracuse L. Rev.
- ISO 4: Syracuse Law Rev.

Indexing
- ISSN: 0039-7938
- OCLC no.: 49516319

Links
- Journal homepage

The Syracuse Law Review, established in 1949, is a legal research and writing program for student editors at Syracuse University College of Law and a national forum for legal scholars. The editorial board publishes three Law Review issues annually, including the Annual Survey of New York Law.

== History ==
The first issue of the Syracuse Law Review was published in 1949. It included articles and commentary by judiciary members, practicing lawyers, law teachers, and students. The volume discussed issues of importance to the legal profession, legal developments and discussed noteworthy cases. Among the 14 leading articles in Volume 1 were articles on legal thinking, judicial rule-making, civil investigations by the Federal Bureau of Investigation. Authors in the inaugural volume included J. Edgar Hoover, first FBI director, and Roscoe Pound, author and dean of Harvard Law School.

In 1962, the Syracuse Law Review began publishing the Annual Survey of New York Law.

In 2021, Hilda Frimpong became the first black student to lead the review.
