= Miss Earth Ghana =

Beauty pageant in Ghana

- Formation: 2002
- Type: Beauty pageant
- Headquarters: Accra
- Location: Ghana
- Members: Miss Earth
- Official language: English

Miss Earth Ghana is a national Beauty pageant that sends representatives to the Miss Earth pageant.

== Titleholders ==
Color key

- Declared as Winner
- Ended as runner-up
- Ended as one of the finalists or semifinalists

Year	Miss Earth Ghana	Venue	Placement at Miss Earth	Special awards
2002	Beverly Asamoah Jecty	Accra		
2003	Ama Amissah Quartey	Accra		
2004	Afua Akyeampong	Accra		
2005	Adjao Akoto	Accra		
2006	Mable Frye	Accra		
2007	Diana Naa Blankson	Accra		
2008	Adoley Addo	Accra		
2009	Mariam Nasara	Accra		
2010	Golda Dayi	Accra		
2011	Patricia Agyeiwaa	Accra		
2013	Amabel Esinam Klutse	Accra		
2014	Nana Ama Odame-Okyere	Accra		
2015	Silvia Commodore	Accra		(silver) Tree Planting Activity; (silver) National Costume (Africa)
2016	Deborah Eyram Dodor	Accra		
2017	Maud Fadi	Accra		(gold) National Costume (Africa)
2018	Belvy Naa	Accra	Top 18	Forever Living Ambassadress
2019	Abena Appiah	Accra	Top 20	(gold) Long Gown (Air); (gold) Resort Wear (Air); (gold) Talent (Air); Miss Vivo; Miss DOH Reg 5 & Miss Infinity Closet; Miss Grand International 2020
2020	Emma Djentuh	Accra		(silver) Talent (Africa); (bronze) Long Gown (Africa)
2021	Nylla Oforiwaa Amparbeng	Accra	Top 20	
2022	Eunice Nkeyasen	Accra		
2023	Priscilla Asante	Accra		
2024	Winifred Esi Sam	Accra		
2025	Cherise Asher Ayisi	Accra		

== See also ==
- Miss Ghana
- Miss Universe Ghana
- Miss International Ghana
- Miss Grand Ghana
