= Miss Grand Ghana 2025 =

3rd Miss Grand Ghana competition, beauty pageant edition

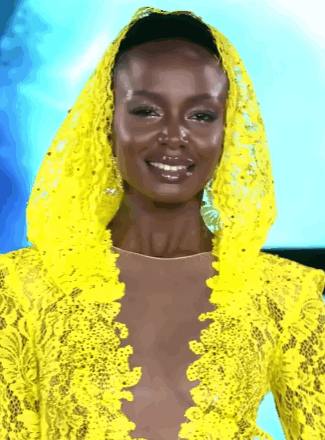
- Faith Maria Porter
- Date: 16 August 2025
- Presenters: Jason El-A; Priscilla Bossman
- Entertainment: KK Fosu
- Venue: The National Theatre, Accra
- Broadcaster: MX24 TV
- Entrants: 13
- Placements: 10
- Withdrawals: Ahafo; Savannah; Upper East
- Winner: Faith Maria Porter (Greater Accra)

External videos
- Grand final competition

Miss Grand Ghana 2025 was the third edition of the Miss Grand Ghana beauty pageant, held on 16 August 2025 at The National Theatre, Accra. Thirteen contestants, each was assigned to represent one of the region of the country, competed for the right to represent the country at its parent international stage, Miss Grand International 2025.

At the end of the event, Sage-La'Parriea Yakubu, Miss Grand Ghana 2024, of Greater Accra crowned her successor, Faith Maria Porter, also from Greater Accra. Porter represented Ghana at the Miss Grand International 2025 pageant held in Thailand on 18 October 2025 and placed third runner-up, the country's highest placement to date.

In addition to the 2025 candidate to Miss Grand International, the pageant's first runner-up, who is of Togolese descent, Rebecca Attiogbe, was appointed the country representative for the next year's international edition, while one of the top 5, Vanessa Obeng, was appointed Miss Aura Ghana 2026.

== Result ==
Miss Grand Ghana 2025 competition results by region
Color key:
| Winner | 1st Runner-up |
| 2nd Runner-up | Top 5 |
| Top 10 | Unplaced |
No representative

=== Placements ===
| Placement | Contestant |
|---|---|
| Miss Grand Ghana 2025 | Greater Accra - Faith Maria Porter |
| 1st Runner-Up | Volta - Rebecca Attiogbe (Note: Appointed Miss Grand Ghana 2026) |
| 2nd Runner-Up | Ashanti - Makeeba Kaaya |
| Top 5 | Bono - Samche Ellen; Eastern - Vanessa Obeng (Note: Later promoted to the 3rd runner-up and appointed Miss Aura Ghana 2026) |
| Top 10 | Bono East - Comfort Ferguson; Central - Efua Dampty; Northern - Rukayath Yakubu; Oti - Lycia Farrel; Western North - Berlinda Boakye Yiadom |

=== Special awards ===
| Award | Contestant |
|---|---|
| Best Interview | Eastern - Vanessa Obeng |
| Best in Sashing Ceremony | Ashanti - Makeeba Kaaya |
| Best in Swimsuit | Greater Accra - Faith Maria Porter |
| Grand Voice Award | Greater Accra - Faith Maria Porter |
| Miss Congeniality | Volta - Rebecca Attiogbe |
| Miss Elegance | Bono - Samche Ellen |
| Miss Finesse | Ashanti - Makeeba Kaaya |
| Miss Photogenic | Ashanti - Makeeba Kaaya |

== Contestants ==
The following 13 contestants competed for the title:

| Represented | Contestant |
|---|---|
| Ashanti Region | Makeeba Kaaya |
| Bono Region | Samche Ellen |
| Bono East Region | Comfort Ferguson |
| Central Region | Stacy Efua–Damptsie |
| Eastern Region | Vanessa Obeng |
| Greater Accra Region | Faith Maria Porter |
| Northern Region | Rukayath Yakubu |
| North East Region | Edith Debrah |
| Oti Region | Lycia Farrel |
| Upper West Region | Mercy Boafo |
| Volta Region | Rebecca Attiogbe |
| Western Region | Rebecca Tetteh |
| Western North Region | Berlinda Boakye Yiadom |
