= Miss Grand Crimea =

Russian beauty pageant title

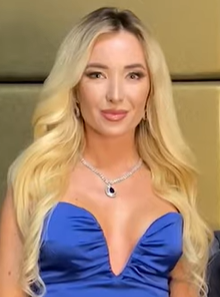
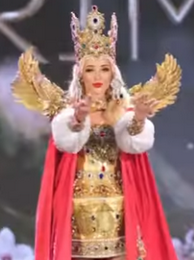
- Yulia Pavlikova, Miss Grand Crimea 2022
- Formation: 2020
- Type: Beauty pageant
- Location: Crimea
- Members: Miss Grand International
- Official language: Russian
- National director: Sasha Waseem

Miss Grand Crimea is a female beauty pageant title awarded to Crimean representatives competing in the Miss Grand International contest. The first Crimean at Miss Grand International was a Khabarovsk-based model, Sofia Kim, assigned in 2020 by Anton Sergeevi; however, Sofia didn't place at the Miss Grand International 2020 semifinals held in Thailand, and the franchise was discontinued. Sergeevi instead purchased the license for Miss Grand Russia the following year.

Crimea competed at Miss Grand International again in 2022 after the franchise was granted to a Hong Kong–based television producer, Sasha Waseem, and a 29-year-old model and the organizer of Miss Tourism Crimea from Kerch, Yulia Pavlikova, was appointed as that year's representative; however, Yulia also went unplaced. After the competition, Yulia reported to some Crimean media that the ongoing Russo-Ukrainian War made the organizer not allow her to qualify for the final 20.

== International competition ==
The following is a list of Crimean representatives at the Miss Grand International contest.

Year	Representative	Original national title	Result	National director
2020	Sofia Kim	Miss Khabarovsk Territory 2019	Unplaced	Anton Sergeevi
2022	Yulia Pavlikova	Queen of Russia 2020	Unplaced	Sasha Waseem
