= Menaye Donkor =

Ghanaian-Canadian businesswoman

- Born: 20 March 1981 (age 45); Toronto, Ontario, Canada
- Citizenship: Canadian; Ghanaian
- Education: York University (BBA)
- Occupations: businesswoman, model, entrepreneur, philanthropist
- Known for: Miss Universe Ghana, 2004
- Height: 180 cm (5 ft 11 in)
- Spouse: Sulley Muntari (m. 2010)
- Children: 2

Menaye Donkor (born 20 March 1981) is a Canadian-born Ghanaian businesswoman, entrepreneur, model, and philanthropist. She was Miss Universe Ghana in 2004. Donkor is married to Ghanaian professional footballer Sulley Muntari.

== Early life and education ==
Menaye Donkor was born in Toronto and raised in Accra, Ghana. She is the youngest of seven siblings, with four brothers and two sisters. At the age of seven, she inherited the "Royal Stool Bearer" title from her paternal grandmother, the queen mother of Agona Asafo. Donkor received her primary education at Morning Star School in Ghana and studied in Boston, Massachusetts, US, during high school. She later returned to Toronto to study business marketing at York University, where she graduated with honours.

== Career ==
In her early twenties, Donkor won the title of Miss Universe Ghana and worked as a model. She appeared on the covers of magazines such as New African Woman, Pompey Life, SportsWeek (La Gazzetta dello sport), Canoe Magazine, and Maxim Italy.

She represented Chopard at the Cannes Film Festival in 2012 and 2013. From 2006 until 2009, she co-managed and marketed her then-boyfriend, later husband, Sulley Muntari's brand. In 2012, she became the face of Printex, a fabric and textiles company in Ghana.

=== SHE-Y by Menaye ===
Menaye founded the Italian brand SHE-Y, which launched its first range of all-natural products using ethically sourced Shea butter from Ghana in 2016.

== Personal life ==
Menaye is married to Sulley Muntari, and they have two children. She is the cousin of Ama K. Abebrese. She is a Christian.

== Philanthropy ==
Menaye established the Menaye Charity Organization in 2004 to support children's education in Ghana.

In 2021, her company, Sincerëly Ghana Limited, partnered with Project BRAVE to distribute sanitary pads to young women in Keta, Volta Region. The company launched the Sister-2-Sister initiative to provide sanitary pads to women in disadvantaged communities in Ghana.

== Honours and recognition ==
In September 2012, Menaye was appointed as the ‘Nkosuohemaa’ or ‘Development Queen’ of Agona Asafo in the Central Region of Ghana. Her official title is Nanahemaa Menaye Afumade Afrakoma I. In 2015, Menaye received a special mention at the Infant Charity Awards in Milan for her work with children.
