= Rebecca Kwabi =

Ghanaian beauty queen, Miss Ghana

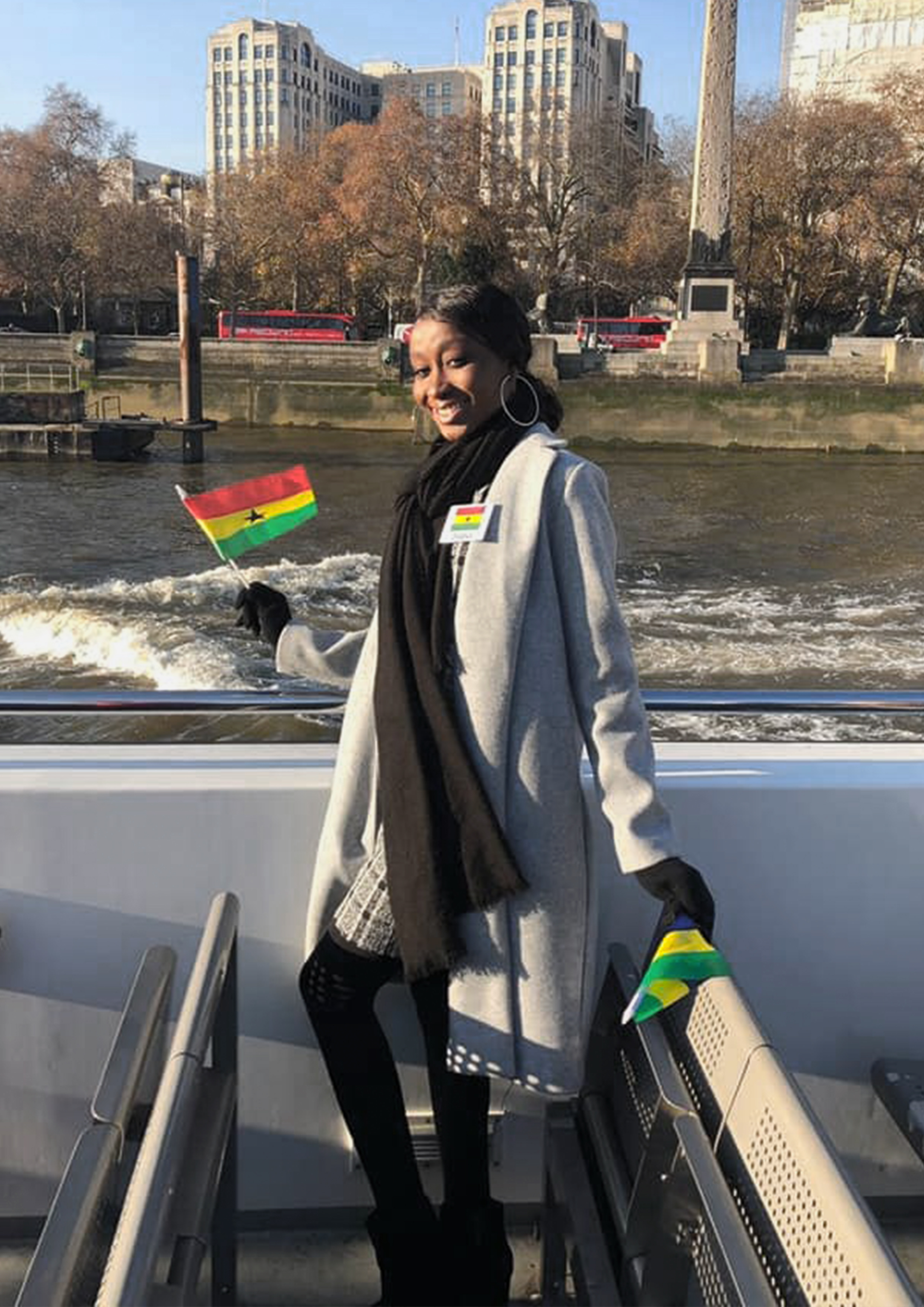
- Rebecca Kwabi representing Ghana at Miss World 2019 in London
- Education: Bluecrest University College, Maureen's Signature Institute of Fashion
- Occupation: Fashion designer
- Beauty pageant titleholder
- Title: Miss Ghana 2019
- Hair color: Black
- Eye color: Brown
- Major competitions: Miss Ghana 2019 (Winner); Miss World 2019 (Delegate)

Rebecca Nana Adwoa Kwabi is a Ghanaian fashion designer and beauty pageant titleholder. She was crowned Miss Ghana 2019 and represented Ghana at the Miss World 2019.

== Early life and education ==
Kwabi was born in Tema. She attended Teshie Presbyterian Senior High School and continued to study fashion designing at Bluecrest University College and Maureen's Signature Institute of Fashion.

== Career ==
Kwabi was crowned Miss Ghana in 2019. She was awarded Miss Skinned, Miss Top Model, Miss Photogenic and Miss Fitness at the Miss Ghana 2019. She represented Ghana at the Miss World 2019. She made Top 30 Miss World Beauty With A Purpose.

Kwabi has been featured in Poland Newspaper, Celopatra Magazine and Sharina Magazine.
