= Chelsea Tayui =

Ghanaian beauty pageant contestant (born 1995)

- Born: 31 May 1995 (age 31); Ghana
- Education: DePaul University
- Occupations: Communication and Media executive
- Beauty pageant titleholder
- Title: Miss Universe Ghana 2020
- Hair color: Black
- Eye color: Brown
- Major competitions: Miss Universe Ghana 2020 (Winner); Miss Universe 2020 (Unplaced)

Chelsea Tayui (born 31 May 1995) is a Ghanaian model and beauty pageant titleholder who was crowned Miss Universe Ghana in 2020 and represented Ghana at the Miss Universe 2020 pageant.

== Early life and education ==
Tayui is a native of Keta in the Volta Region of Ghana. She graduated from the DePaul University in Chicago, U.S. with a bachelor's degree in Communications and Media. She is a communications executive currently works part time as the communications director for The KJM Foundation - a non-profit organization (NGO) seeking to create a world where every individual has access to basic human needs. She initially started as a volunteer with KJM working on several developmental projects including clean water projects for impoverished villages in Ghana.

== Pageantry ==
=== Miss Universe Ghana 2020 ===
On 26 September 2020, Tayui was crowned Miss Universe Ghana at a private ceremony held at the Labadi Beach Hotel, Accra. Due to complications resolving from COVID-19 pandemic in Ghana, the regular open mass scouting session was not used. She was appointed and crowned after a unanimous decision between MALZ Promotions, organisers of the pageant in Ghana and Miss Universe International, was reached to privately appoint her as the Miss Universe Ghana. As Miss Universe Ghana 2020, she competed at the Miss Universe 2020 pageant.

=== Miss Universe 2020 ===
Tayui represented Ghana at the Miss Universe 2020, which was held in May 2021 at Seminole Hard Rock Hotel & Casino in Hollywood, Florida, United States After the competition had been postponed from late 2020 to mid 2021 due to the COVID-19 pandemic. She however did not make it into the Top 21.

Awards and achievements
Preceded by Akpene Diata Hoggar	Miss Universe Ghana; 2020	Succeeded by Naa Morkor Commodore
