= Miss Universe Ghana =

National beauty pageant competition in Ghana

Miss Universe Ghana Organization
- Formation: 1999; 27 years ago
- Type: Beauty pageant
- Headquarters: Accra
- Location: Ghana
- Members: Miss Universe
- Official language: English
- Director: Kate Ndi
- Staff: Malz Productions
- Website: www.missuniverseghanaorg.com

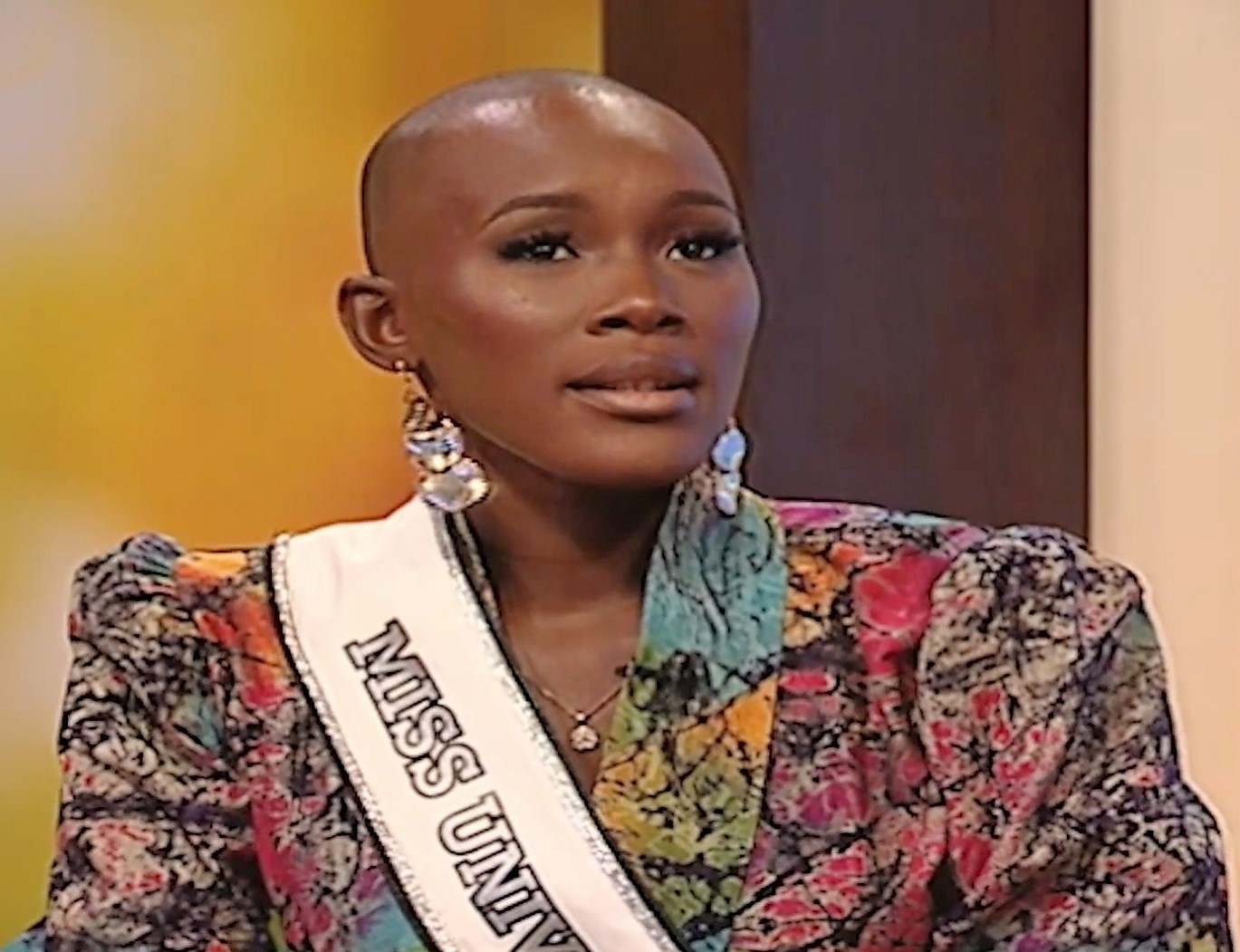
Miss Universe Ghana 2022, Engracia Mofuman

Miss Universe Ghana, whose slogan is Ghana's Next Sweetheart, is a national pageant that sends representatives to the Miss Universe pageant. This pageant is unrelated to Miss Ghana or Miss Earth Ghana pageant. The current Miss Universe Ghana is Andromeda Peters.

== History ==
The Miss Universe Ghana launched for the first time in 1999. The pageant independently built to select the Ghanaian representative at Miss Universe pageant. R. Ayote Okyne took over the license from Miss Ghana pageant who operated for long in the country. The Miss Universe Ghana Organization in May 2017 handed to former Miss Universe Ghana winner, Menaye Donkor under Malz Productions, until the owner finally gave up the license in 2022 period.

=== Directorships ===
- Osagyefo Dr. Kwame Nkrumah, Miss Ghana (1991―1998)
- R. Ayote Okyne and Juliette Korsah as national director (1999―2015)
- Menaye Donkor, Malz Productions (2017―2022)

== Formats ==
The Miss Universe Ghana competition is traditionally holding region representation every year. The 16 region representatives will compete for the crown. In the finale result there will be Second Runner-up, First Runner-up, then finally Miss Universe Ghana winner.

- Miss Ahafo
- Miss Ashanti
- Miss Bono
- Miss Bono East
- Miss Central
- Miss Eastern
- Miss Greater Accra
- Miss North East
- Miss Northern
- Miss Oti
- Miss Savannah
- Miss Upper East
- Miss Upper West
- Miss Volta
- Miss Western
- Miss Western North

== Titleholders ==
- : Declared as Winner
- : Ended as runner-up or top 5/6 qualification
- : Ended as one of the finalists or semifinalists
- : Ended as special awards winner

On occasion, when the winner does not qualify (due to age) for either contest, a runner-up is sent.

Year	Region	Miss Universe Ghana	Placement at Miss Universe	Special Award(s)	Notes
Kate Ndi — a franchise holder to Miss Universe from 2024
2026	Greater Accra	Belvy Ofori Naa	TBA		
2025	Central	Andromeda Osam-Peters	Unplaced		Appointed − She was also formerly crowned as Miss United States 2018.
Did not compete between 2023−2024
Menaye Donkor directorship — a franchise holder to Miss Universe between 2017―2022
After the Ghana team's decision not to renew the Miss Universe licensing contract, Ghana is absent from 2023.
2022	Ashanti	Engracia Mofuman	Unplaced		
2021	Greater Accra	Naa Morkor Commodore	Unplaced		
2020	Volta	Chelsea Tayui	Unplaced		
Did not compete in 2019
2018	Brong-Ahafo	Akpene Diata Hoggar	Unplaced		
2017	Central	Ruth Quarshie	Top 16		
R. Ayite Okyne and Juliette Korsah directorship — a franchise holder to Miss Universe between 1999―2015
After the Ghana team's decision not to renew the Miss Universe licensing contract, Ghana is absent from 2016.
2015	Ashanti	Hilda Akua Frimpong	Unplaced		
2014	Greater Accra	Abena Akuaba Appiah	Unplaced		Later, in 2020 Abena became a representation of the United States at Miss Grand International, and she won the title in Thailand.
2013	Greater Accra	Hanniel Jamin Chihanny	Unplaced		
2012	Greater Accra	Gifty Ofori Fremah	Unplaced		
2011	Greater Accra	Yayra Erica Nego	Unplaced		Erica won Miss Minnesota USA 2009 as an American citizen, and placed in Top 15 at Miss USA 2009.
2010	Greater Accra	Awurama Simpson	Unplaced		
2009	Greater Accra	Jennifer Koranteng	Unplaced		
2008	Greater Accra	Yvette Nsiah	Unplaced		
Did not compete in 2007
2006	Greater Accra	Angela Asare	Unplaced	Miss Congeniality	
Did not compete in 2005
2004	Greater Accra	Menaye Donkor	Unplaced		a President of Miss Universe Ghana Organization between 2017―2022.
Did not compete in 2003
2002	Greater Accra	Stephanie Walkins-Fia	Unplaced		
2001	Greater Accra	Precious Agyare	Unplaced		
2000	Greater Accra	Maame Esi Acquah	Unplaced		
Osagyefo Dr. Kwame Nkrumah directorship — a franchise holder to Miss Universe between 1991―1998
1999	Greater Accra	Akuba Cudjoe	Top 10		
1998	Greater Accra	Francisca Awuah	Unplaced		
Did not compete in 1997
1996	Greater Accra	Pearl Amoah	Unplaced		
Did not compete between 1994—1995
1993	Greater Accra	Jamilla Haruna Danzuru	Unplaced	Miss Congeniality	
Did not compete in 1992
1991	Greater Accra	Dela Tamakloe	Unplaced		

=== Wins by region ===
Region	Titles	Years
Greater Accra	18	1991, 1993, 1996, 1998, 1999, 2000, 2001, 2002, 2004, 2006, 2008, 2009, 2010, 2011, 2012, 2013, 2014, 2021
Central	2	2017, 2025
Ashanti	2	2015, 2022
Brong-Ahafo; Before Referendum	1	2018
Volta	1	2020

== See also ==
- Miss Ghana
- Miss Universe Ghana
- Miss International Ghana
- Miss Earth Ghana
- Miss Grand Ghana
