= Karina Ramos =

Costa Rican TV host and model (born 1993)

Karina Ramos Leiton
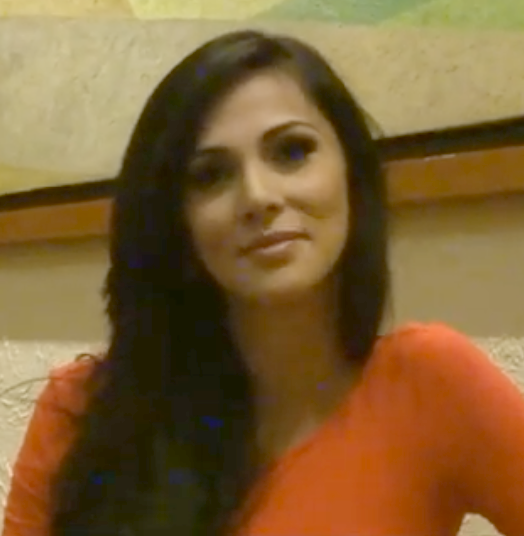
- Ramos Leiton in 2014
- Born: July 14, 1993 (age 33); Heredia, Costa Rica
- Height: 1.73 m (5 ft 8 in)
- Beauty pageant titleholder
- Title: Miss Supranational Costa Rica 2012; Miss Costa Rica 2014
- Hair color: Brown
- Eye color: Hazel
- Major competitions: Miss Supranational 2012 (Top 20); Miss Belleza Americana 2013 (3rd Runner-up) (Best Body); Reina Internacional de la Paz 2013 (Winner); Reina Internacional de la Ganaderia 2013 (1st Runner-up) (Reina de los periodistas); Miss Turismo Latino 2013 (3rd Runner-up) (Miss Culture); Miss Costa Rica 2014 (Winner); Miss Universe 2014 (Unplaced)

Karina Ramos Leiton (born July 14, 1993) is a Costa Rican TV host, model and beauty pageant titleholder who was crowned Miss Costa Rica 2014 and represented her country at Miss Universe 2014. She's also the CEO, and owner of the modeling agency Imagination Agency S.A., created by her for preparing future beauty pageant candidates.

== Career ==
After winning Miss Costa Rica 2014, her career took off to the international level. She has been modeling worldwide and walking at New York Fashion Week, Los Angeles Fashion Week and Miami Swim Week.

== Pageantry ==
Karina Ramos has been a finalist in various beauty pageants including Miss International Supranational, International Livestock Queen, International Peace Queen, and Miss Tourism Latino.

=== 2012 ===
In 2012, Ramos represented Costa Rica at the third session of Miss Supranational 2012 in Płock, Poland. She placed in the Top 20, and became the first Costa Rican to advance in the semifinals at Miss Supranational.

=== 2013 ===
Ramos represented Costa Rica at the Miss Belleza Americana 2013. She was the 3rd runner-up and won the Best Body award.

Ramos represented Costa Rica at the Reina Internacional de la Paz 2013 and won the title.

Ramos represented Costa Rica at the Reina Internacional de la Ganadería 2013, where she was the 1st runner-up and was awarded the Reina de los periodistas.

Ramos represented Costa Rica at the Miss Turismo Latino 2013, where she was the 3rd Runner-up and was awarded as Miss Culture.

=== 2014 ===
Ramos was one of the 60 pre-delegates in the competition, and the representative of San José Province. She placed first in individual skills and won the title of Miss Costa Rica and represented Costa Rica in Miss Universe 2014.

== Road accident ==
In October 2024, Ramos was involved in a traffic collision in the La Peregrina area of La Uruca, Costa Rica. Her Hummer collided with a motorcyclist, who sustained a fractured clavicle and left shoulder and was hospitalised while awaiting surgery following the incident. Ramos stated on social media that she believed the motorcyclist had failed to stop at an intersection and said she remained in contact with the injured man's family. Costa Rica’s traffic police reported that she was fined ₡24,000 for driving with an expired license.

== Legal issues and harassment ==
In 2020, Ramos was involved in civil litigation against the Costa Rican media company Multimedios Costa Rica over alleged defamation related to statements made during a televised interview. Ramos sought financial compensation for alleged reputational damage. However, the I Circuit Court of San José dismissed the lawsuit in February 2020, finding insufficient evidence to establish the broadcaster's liability. She subsequently announced that she would appeal the ruling, arguing procedural inconsistencies and errors in the court’s assessment of the evidence.

Beginning in 2021, Ramos publicly reported being subjected to ongoing harassment by a man whom she identified as having contacted her persistently through social media since at least 2015. According to La Nación, Ramos filed a criminal complaint in September 2021 alleging coercion under Article 193 of the Costa Rican Penal Code. Her attorney stated that notification of the suspect had been delayed due to difficulties locating him.

In mid-2022, Ramos reported that the alleged harassment had escalated, including incidents in which the suspect allegedly appeared outside her residence in Mexico. Media reports indicated that migration records confirmed the individual had traveled abroad during the relevant dates. Ramos stated that a prior conciliation agreement had been reached earlier that year, but that she intended to pursue further legal action following the new incidents.

In September 2022, media reported that Ramos had entered Costa Rica’s Public Prosecutor’s Victim Protection Program after additional alleged attempts by the suspect to approach her residences in both Costa Rica and Mexico. According to her lawyer, a new complaint was filed after the suspect allegedly failed to comply with a previous conciliation agreement and continued contact despite judicial measures. The Public Prosecutor’s Office declined to confirm specific details, citing victim protection regulations.

Awards and achievements
Preceded by Laura Bolaños	Representatión of San José; 2014	Succeeded by Incumbent
Preceded by Fabiana Granados	Miss Costa Rica; 2014	Succeeded by Brenda Castro
