= Brenda Castro =

Costa Rican model and beauty pageant titleholder

- Born: Brenda Giselle Castro Madrigal; Guápiles, Costa Rica
- Height: 1.68 m (5 ft 6 in)
- Beauty pageant titleholder
- Hair color: Brown
- Eye color: Black
- Major competitions: Miss Latinoamérica Costa Rica 2014 (Winner); Miss Latinoamérica International 2014 (3rd Runner-up); Miss Costa Rica 2015; (Winner); Miss Universe 2015; (Unplaced); Miss Grand International 2019; (Top 21)

Brenda Giselle Castro Madrigal is a Costa Rican beauty pageant titleholder who won Miss Costa Rica 2015 and represented her country at the Miss Universe 2015 pageant. She also represented Costa Rica at Miss Grand International 2019 in Caracas.

== Career ==
Castro began modeling at age 15.

Castro had previously won Señorita Expo-Pococí 2008, Miss Teenager Costa Rica 2011, Miss Latinoamérica Costa Rica 2014 and Señorita Verano Costa Rica 2015. She was also second runner-up Miss Teenager International 2011 and third runner-up Miss Latinoamerica International 2014.

Castro won Miss Costa Rica representing Limon, in La Sabana and broadcast on Teletica, She crowned by Karina Ramos, Miss Universe Costa Rica 2014. As Miss Costa Rica, she competed at Miss Universe 2015 on 20 December 2015, and was unplacemed.

Awards and achievements
Preceded by Karina Ramos	Miss Costa Rica; 2015	Succeeded by Carolina Rodríguez
