= Miss International Ghana =

Beauty contest

- Formation: 2016
- Type: Beauty pageant
- Headquarters: Accra
- Location: Ghana
- Members: Miss International
- Official language: English
- Director: Delphine Brew Hammond
- Affiliations: Miss Tourism Ghana Organization
- Website: Miss Tourism Ghana

Miss International Ghana, who is related to Miss Tourism Ghana, is a national pageant that sends representatives to the Miss International beauty pageant. This pageant is unrelated to Miss Universe Ghana, Miss Ghana or Miss Earth Ghana pageant.

== Franchise holder ==
Miss Tourism Ghana since 2016 was mandated by Miss International Foundation or ICA (International Cultural Association) as "The Franchise holder of Miss International for Ghana". The one of title holders of Miss Tourism Ghana will represent Ghana at the Miss International competition in Japan.

== Titleholders ==
Boldface indicates winner of the Miss International

Color key

- Declared as Winner
- Ended as runner-up
- Ended as one of the finalists or semifinalists

Year	Miss International Ghana	Miss Tourism Ghana	Hometown	Placement	Special Awards
2026	Christabel Lamptey		Accra	TBA	TBA
2025	Portia Akua Mensah		Accra	Unplaced	Best National Costume
2024	Celestina Obeng	Winner in 2019	Tepa	Unplaced	
**Did not compete in 2023**
2022	Jennifer Deku	First Runner-up in 2020	Sekondi-Takoradi	Did not compete	
2019	Princess Owusua Gyamfi	Second Runner-up in 2019	Accra	Unplaced	
2018	Benedicta Nana Adjei	Second Runner-up in 2018	Accra	Unplaced	
2017	Daniella Akorfa Awuma	Second Runner-up in 2016	Accra	**Top 15**	**Miss International Africa**
2016	Cindy Shirley Kofie	Second Runner-up in 2015	Accra	Unplaced	

== See also ==
- Miss Ghana
- Miss Universe Ghana
- Miss International Ghana
- Miss Earth Ghana
- Miss Grand Ghana
