= Miss Ghana =

Beauty pageant

Miss Ghana Organization
- Formation: 1957
- Type: Beauty pageant
- Headquarters: Accra
- Location: Ghana
- Members: Miss World; Miss Supranational
- Official language: English
- Key people: Inna Mariam Patty

Miss Ghana is a national Beauty pageant in Ghana.

== Titleholders ==
=== Miss World Ghana ===
- : Declared as Winner
- : Ended as runner-up or top 5/6 qualification
- : Ended as one of the finalists or semifinalists
- : Ended as special awards winner

Ghana debuted at Miss World 1959 with Star Nyaniba Annan. However, there have been two candidates (1990 and 1991) who represented Ghana at Miss World but were not Miss Ghana titleholders. There are also several years that Ghana did not send a representative to Miss World even though there was a titleholder.

Year	Miss Ghana	Miss World Ghana	Placement at Miss World	Special Awards
1957	Monica Amekoafia	Did not compete		
1958	Janet Boateng	Did not compete		
1959	Star Nyaniba Annan	Star Nyaniba Annan	Unplaced	
1960	Comfort Kwamena	Did not compete		
1967	Araba Martha Vroom	Araba Martha Vroom	Top 15	
1968	Lovell Rosebud Wordie	Lovell Rosebud Wordie	Unplaced	
1986	Magdalene Adjabeng	Did not compete		
1987	Augustina Henaku	Did not compete		
1988	Dzidzo Abra Amoa	Dzidzo Abra Amoa	Unplaced	
1989	Afua Amoah Bonsu	Afua Amoah Bonsu	Unplaced	
1990	Bridgitte Dzorgbenuku	Dela Tamakole	Unplaced	
1991	No pageant	Jamilla Haruna Danzuru	Unplaced	
1994	Matilda Aku Alomatu	Matilda Aku Alomatu	Unplaced	
1995	Manuela Medie	Manuela Medie	Unplaced	World Designer Dress
1996	Shiela Azuntaba	Shiela Azuntaba	Unplaced	
1997	Benita Sena Golomeke	Benita Sena Golomeke	Unplaced	
1998	Efia Owusu Marfo	Efia Owusu Marfo	Unplaced	
1999	Mariam Sugru Bugri	Mariam Sugri Bugri	Unplaced	
2000	Maame Ewurafua Hawkson	Maame Ewurafua Hawkson	Unplaced	
2001	Selasi Kwawu	Selasi Kwanu	Unplaced	
2002	Shaida Buari	Shaida Buari	Unplaced	
2003	Serena Naa Dei Ashi-Roye	Did not compete		
2004	Inna Mariam Patty	Serena Naa Dei Ashi-Roye	Unplaced	
2005	Lamisi Mbillah	Inna Mariam Patty	Unplaced	
2006	Irene Dwomoh	Lamisi Mbillah	Top 17	
2007	Frances Takyi-Mensah	Irene Dwomoh	Top 16	Beauty With A Purpose
2008	Mawusi Apea	Frances Takyi-Mensah	Unplaced	Best Talent
2009	Mimi Areme	Mawusi Apea	Unplaced	
2010	Stephanie Karikari	Mimi Areme	Unplaced	
2011	No pageant	Stephanie Karikari	Unplaced	
2012	Carranzar Shooter	Did not compete		
2013	Gusepinna Baafi	Carranzar Shooter	2nd Runner-up	
2014	No pageant	Nadia Naa Densua Ntanu	Top 26	
2015	Antoinette Kemavor	Did not compete		
2016	No pageant	Antoinette Kemavor	Top 20	
2017	Margaret Mwintuur	Afua Asieduwaa Akrofi	Unplaced	
2018	Margaret Derry	Nana Ama Benson	Unplaced	
2019	Rebecca Nana Adwoa Kwabi	Rebecca Nana Adwoa Kwabi	Unplaced	
Due to the impact of COVID-19 pandemic, no pageant between 2020
2021	Monique Mawulawe Agbedekpui	Monique Mawulawe Agbedekpui	Unplaced	
2022	No competition held			
2023	Miriam Xorlasi	Miriam Xorlasi	Unplaced	
2024	No competition held			
2025	Jutta Pokuah	Jutta Pokuah	Unplaced	
2026	Rumzia Sule	Rumzia Sule	Unplaced	

=== Miss Supranational Ghana ===
- : Declared as Winner
- : Ended as runner-up or top 5/6 qualification
- : Ended as one of the finalists or semifinalists
- : Ended as special awards winner

On occasion, when the winner does not qualify (due to age) for either contest, a runner-up is sent.

Year	Region	Miss Supranational Ghana	Placement at Miss Supranational	Special Awards	Notes
2026	Accra	Naa Asheley Nartey	Unplaced		
2025	Accra	Valentina Nartey	Withdrew		
2024	Accra	Abigail Fanna Kabirou	Unplaced		
2023	Somanya	Helen Demey Matey	Unplaced		
2022	Akwatia	Gifty Boakye	Unplaced		
2021	Accra	Verónica Sarfo Adu Nti	Unplaced		
2015	Accra	Charlee Esi Bekoe Berbicks	Unplaced		
2013	Accra	Gety Baffoa	Unplaced		

== See also ==
- Miss Universe Ghana
- Miss International Ghana
- Miss Earth Ghana
- Miss Grand Ghana
