= Miss Earth USA 2022 =

18th edition of the Miss Earth USA beauty pageant

- Date: January 8, 2022
- Presenters: Brittany Ann Payne
- Venue: Linda Chapin Theater at the Orange County Convention Center, Orlando, Florida
- Entrants: 51
- Placements: 20
- Winner: Natalia Salmon (Dethroned); Brielle Simmons (Assumed)
- Photogenic: Hannah Welborn-Lewis; Haley McElravy

Miss Earth USA 2022 was the 18th edition of the Miss Earth USA pageant held on January 8, 2022 in Orlando, Florida. Marisa Butler of Maine crowned Natalia Salmon of Pennsylvania as her successor at the end of the event, but she later lost the title for unknown reasons. Brielle Simons of Connecticut Miss Water (2nd runner-up) has crowned the new Miss Earth USA after Miss Air (1st runner-up) Faith Porter, who had already ascended the title of Miss District of Columbia USA 2022, and Simmons represented the United States at Miss Earth 2022, but did not place.

== Delegates ==
51 contestants participated:

State	Delegate	Placements	Notes
Alabama	Charnae Ware	Top 20	
Alaska	Kimberly Keen		
Arizona	Lindsay McVay		
Arkansas	Susie Damm		Great-niece of Myrna Hansen, Miss USA 1953
California	Joecelyn Mendez		
Colorado	Stephanie Lugo	Top 12	
Connecticut	Brielle Simmons	Miss Earth USA Water 2022	Later became Miss Earth USA 2022 after the original winner lost her title for unknown reasons.
Delaware	Emily McPherson		
District of Columbia	Faith Porter	Miss Earth USA Air 2022	Later Miss District of Columbia USA 2022 & Top 16 at Miss USA 2022
Florida	Minh Nguyen		She is born in Vietnam but she raised in United States
Georgia	Erielle Scott		
Hawaii	Jewel Mahoe		
Idaho	Jane Casupanan		
Illinois	Tyler Forbes		
Indiana	Kayla Groen		
Iowa	Rose Pidgorodetska	Top 12	
Kansas	Lillie Davis		
Kentucky	Kennedy Eden		
Louisiana	Danielle Purtell	Top 20	
Maine	Lexie Elston		Previously Miss Maine USA 2019
Maryland	Kennedy Williams		
Massachusetts	Olivia Bulgin		
Michigan	Taylor James		
Minnesota	Peyton Obermeier		
Mississippi	Udeme Ikaiddi		
Missouri	Tyler Prugh	Top 20	
Montana	Josie Allred		
Nebraska	Ashley Lindgren		
Nevada	Jory Kratz	Top 20	
New Hampshire	Alexsys Campbell		
New Jersey	Teni Bello	Top 20	
New Mexico	Ilyhanee Robles	Top 12	
New York	Marizza Delgado	Top 20	
North Carolina	Hannah Welborn-Lewis	Miss Earth USA Fire 2022	
North Dakota	Haley McElravy		
Ohio	Shivani Sharma		
Oklahoma	Emma Loney	Miss Earth USA Eco 2022	Previously competed in 2021 representing Wisconsin
Oregon	Saphyone White	Top 12	
Pennsylvania	Natalia Salmon	Miss Earth USA 2022	
Rhode Island	Mikala Joly	Top 20	
South Carolina	Savannah Bethea	Top 12	
South Dakota	Madeline Delp	Top 12	
Tennessee	Lan Do		
Texas	Nikki Najera	Top 20	
Utah	Ba'Leigh Burns		
Vermont	Megan Cox		
Virginia	Nicky Kandola	Top 12	
Washington	Christina Blake		
West Virginia	Nola Tolsma		
Wisconsin	Tonia Thompson Johnson		
Wyoming	Elizabeth Tillery		
