= Caroline Sampson =

Ghanaian media personality

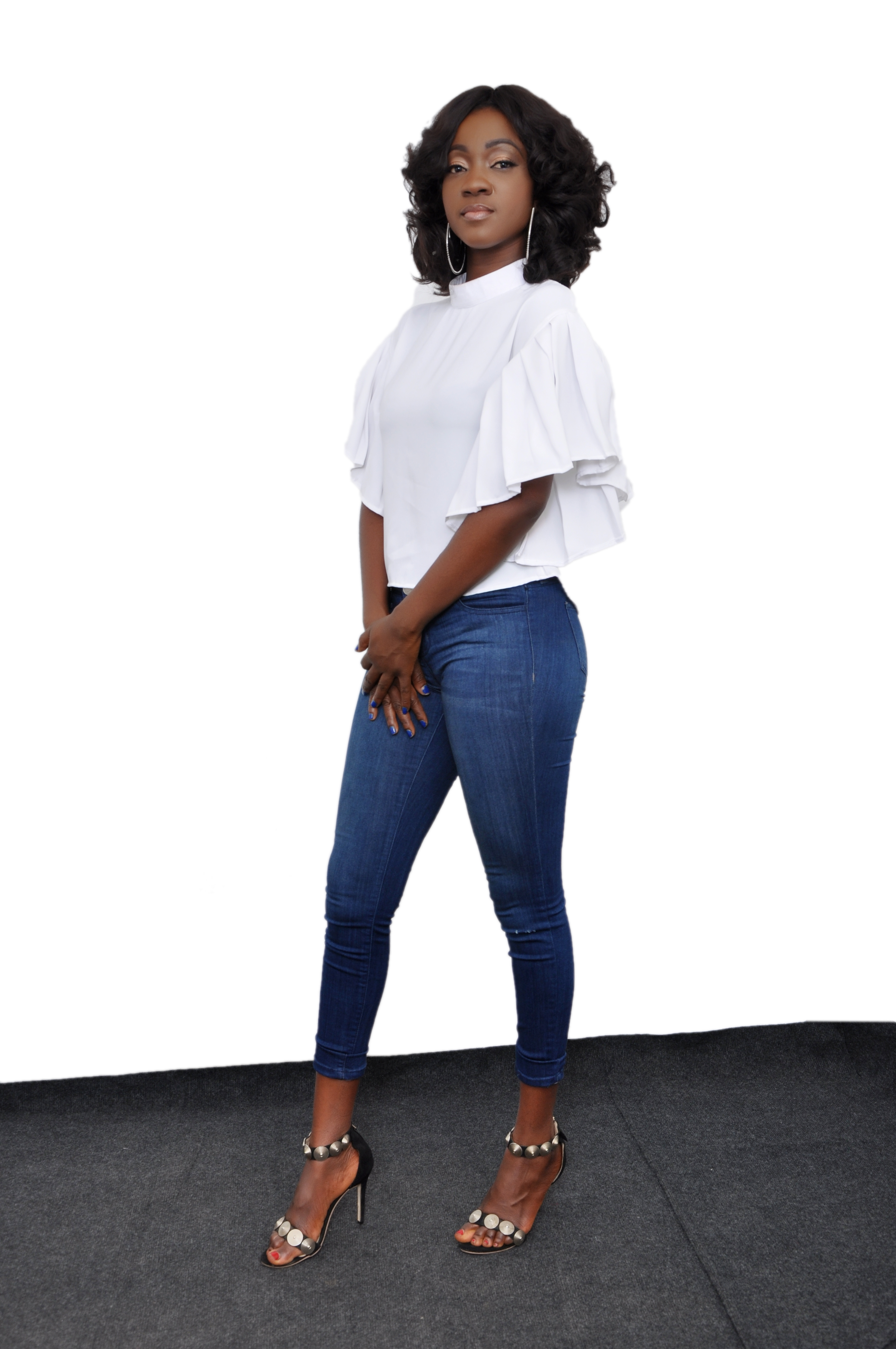
- Caroline Sampson
- Born: 2 August 1984; Tema, Ghana
- Education: Creator School, Mfantsiman Girls' Secondary School
- Occupations: Radio personality, TV personality, Master of Ceremony (MC), Voiceover artist
- Years active: 2005–present
- Known for: Atlantis Radio GTV, TV3, Citi FM, ETV Ghana, Yfm, Kwese TV, Asaase Radio
- Notable work: U-Win Game Show, Hitz Video, E on E, Citi FM’s Room 973, Shout on Y, Ten2one, Cafe995
- Awards: Best Female Radio Personality Award at Ghana Entertainment Awards, USA - 2024 Best Female Radio Personality at 3rd edition of Ghana Entertainment Awards, USA - 2019 4th XWAC-Africa Award of Honour for Media Excellence - 2019 Best Presenter at Stars Integration of Culture of Africa in Cotonou, Benin - 2009

Caroline Sampson (born 2 August 1984) is a Ghanaian radio presenter, TV show host, compere, and voiceover artist best known for her TV and radio commercials. She began her career in the media in 2005 when she ended up as a finalist in the third edition of the Ghanaian reality TV pageant Miss Malaika Ghana.

In addition to TV and radio presenting, Sampson has hosted reality TV shows, corporate events, movie premieres, and album launches. She was the first anglophone African and Ghanaian to win the award for Best Presenter at the Stars Integration of Culture of Africa festival and competition held in Benin.

== Career ==
=== Modeling ===
Sampson's career began as a contestant in the third edition of the TV reality show, Miss Malaika Ghana, in 2005. She placed among the final 16 contestants.

She also competed in Top Model Ghana in 2006 where she placed as the Runner-up.

She worked as a model with some fashion designers like Kofi Ansah, Ozwald Boateng, Nana Asihene as well as House of Eccentric.

=== Television ===
In 2005, Sampson got her first break on television when she hosted the game show, U-Win Game, that aired on GTV (Ghana National Broadcaster). Later, she hosted Hitz Video, a weekly music video program that aired on the TV3 Ghana network.

In 2009, Sampson joined Global Media Alliance, the parent company of ETV and YFM Ghana; and hosted E on E, a daily entertainment show on ETV Ghana.

In 2017, she moved to Kwese Sport as a host of the station's breakfast show, Head Start and later became host of a sport program, Sports Arena on the same channel.

=== Radio ===
In 2005, while working with GTV, Sampson also began working in radio on the Atlantis radio station in Accra. She hosted two daily drive-time shows, Continuous Drive and Mellow Cruise. Sampson joined Citi FM and hosted three daily shows: Room 973, Rhythms in the Citi and Citi Countdown. After two years with Citi FM, Sampson joined YFM Ghana as a presenter for the weekly show, Shout on Y.

== Brand ambassador ==
In 2017, Sampson and Ghanaian rapper, Kofi Kinaata, were brand ambassadors for beverage company Guinness Ghana. She also was brand ambassador for Woodin (fabric company), and was also the face of beverage company Castle Milk Stout in 2014. Caroline is also a social media influencer and has endorsed brands such as Zeepay, Huawei and World Remit, among others. She is currently the brand ambassador for the Ghanaian airline, Passion Air.

== Awards ==
Caroline Sampson won Best Presenter in 2009 at the Stars Integration of Culture of Africa held in Cotonou, Benin. In 2019, she won Best Female Radio Personality at the 3rd edition of Ghana Entertainment Awards USA. She also received the 4th XWAC-Africa Award of Honour for Media Excellence in the same year.

Caroline Sampson was nominated and again won the Best Female Radio Personality Award at the 2024 Ghana Entertainment Awards in USA.
