= Inna Mariam Patty =

Miss Ghana 2004 and entrepreneur

Inna Patty
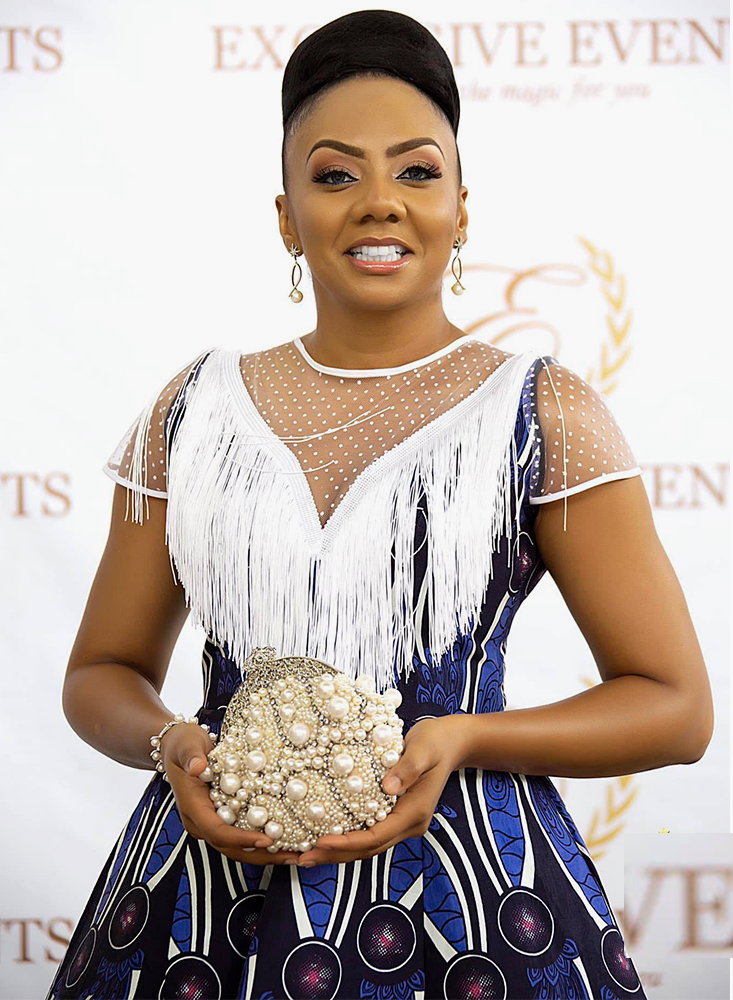
- Inna Mariam Patty
- Born: Inna Mariam Patty; November 26, 1982 (age 43); Accra, Ghana
- Education: Wesley Girls' High School; University of Ghana; London School of Economics; University of Law
- Occupations: social entrepreneur and philanthropist
- Beauty pageant titleholder
- Title: Miss Ghana 2004, Miss World 2005

Inna Mariam Patty (born 1983), popularly referred to as Inna Patty, is a Ghanaian social entrepreneur, philanthropist and beauty pageant titleholder who was crowned Miss Ghana 2004 and represented Ghana in Miss World 2005 at the Crown of Beauty Theatre in Sanya, China. She is the CEO of Exclusive Events Ghana, the organizers of Miss Ghana since 2011.

== Early life and education ==
Patty was born in Ghana but until her early teens spent all her time in Lagos, Nigeria due to the fact that her father Mr Youssif Patty was the then Ghana's High Commissioner to Nigeria. She completed Wesley Girls High School and is an alumnus of the University of Ghana with first class honours. Prior to enrolling at the University of Ghana Business School in 2002, Inna worked with Standard Chartered Bank and Social Security and National Insurance Trust. She also graduated from the London School of Economics in 2008 thereafter she worked as a head-hunter at the Richwell Executives and briefly with the London Stock Exchange before returning to Ghana in 2009 to establish Exclusive Events Ghana. Inna completed a Graduate Diploma in Law with distinction from the University of Law in 2021 and is a member of Lincolns Inn.

She has been a board member of FOCOS Hospital since 2019.

== Awards, nominations and honors ==
Miss Patty was honored by the Class Media Group Ghana for her leadership role and contributions to the beauty pageant industry in Ghana over the last decade.

In 2019, she was listed among 2019 top inspiring entrepreneurs by Humble Beginning Entrepreneurs' (HBE) Award.

In 2017, Exclusive Events Ghana Limited (EEGL) was nominated to receive the International Arch of Europe Award in the Gold Category. It also received the BID Quality Award in July 2017 at the Intercontinental Frankfurt Convention Hall from Hose E Prieto, President of BID.

Inna Patty also made it to the 100 Most Outstanding Women Entrepreneurs in Ghana list in 2016.

== Miss Ghana controversies ==
Patty has been involved in a lot of Miss Ghana controversy in the past where she had to sue Stephanie Karikari (Miss Ghana 2010), Antoinette Delali Kemavor (Miss Ghana 2015), Giuseppina Nana Akua Baafi (Miss Ghana 2013), Margaret Kumah Mintah, Chris Vincent Agyapong and GhanaCelebrities.com who claimed they were pimped to raise money for the pageant. She sued this three former queens for defamation of character.

== Miss Ghana Foundation ==
Patty created the Miss Ghana Foundation in 2013 to carry out philanthropic works in Ghana. It is charity arm of the Miss Ghana with the vision of positively impacting the lives of the less privileged in society, and ensuring projects under health, children, the aged, environment, water, education, and mentorship are sustained. The vehicle through which all social intervention projects aimed at projecting Miss World Beauty with a Purpose Charity (BWAP) are executed. Successes chalked by MGF has helped raised funds to cover cost of surgery for several children with scoliosis, provision of water, care for aged, provided educational scholarships, women empowerment programmes and the environment.
