= Akpene Diata Hoggar =

Ghanaian model

- Born: Akpene Diata Hoggar; Akatsi, Volta Region of Ghana
- Other name: Sun Diata
- Education: Ashesi University
- Occupations: Model; Entrepreneur; Travel blogger
- Years active: 2016–present

Akpene Diata Hoggar is a Ghanaian entrepreneur, blogger, social activist and model. In 2018, she won the Miss Universe Ghana title by representing Volta Region. Later, she represented Ghana in the same contest at the international level in Bangkok, Thailand.

== Early life and education ==
Akpene was born and raised in Akatsi in the Volta Region of Ghana. She attended Ashesi University where she studied Management Information Systems.

== Career ==
Prior to winning the Miss Universe Ghana contest, she contested in the Model Face of Ghana. She co-founded Creatives Anonymous Gh, a creative career guide for the African youth, with her partner Setor Nyendu. She also founded Sundiata Studios, a lifestyle digital agency. Akpene has established Peer Relief, a youth-oriented initiative concerned with mental health. Akpene is also a travel and lifestyle blogger.

Akpene has walked several local and international runway shows as a model including Fashion for Peace Fashion Show at Paris Peace Forum 2018.

Awards and achievements
Preceded by Ruth Quarshie	Miss Universe Ghana; 2019	Succeeded by Chelsea Tayui
