= Faith Maria Porter =

American-born Ghanaian beauty pageant titleholder

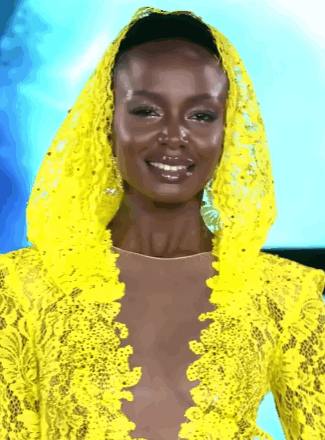
- Porter in 2025
- Born: Baltimore, Maryland, U.S.
- Education: Pace University
- Beauty pageant titleholder
- Title: Miss Earth USA 2022 – Air 2022; Miss District of Columbia USA 2022; Miss Grand Ghana 2025
- Major competitions: Miss Earth USA 2022; (Miss Earth – Air); Miss USA 2022; (Top 16); Miss Grand Ghana 2025; (Winner); Miss Grand International 2025; (3rd Runner-Up); MGI All Stars 2026; (1st Runner-Up)

Faith Maria Porter (born December 9, 1998) is an American-born Ghanaian beauty pageant titleholder who won Miss District of Columbia USA 2022 and Miss Grand Ghana 2025. Representing Ghana she was third runner-up at Miss Grand International 2025, and first runner-up at MGI All Stars 2026.

== Early life and education ==
Faith Maria Porter was born in Baltimore, Maryland. She attended Annapolis Area Christian School and later graduated from Pace University, with a degree in Arts, Entertainment, and Media Management.

== Pageantry ==
Porter represented the District of Columbia at Miss Earth USA 2022 held on January 8, 2022 in Orlando, Florida. Porter was first runner up and won the Miss Earth-Air title. She went on to win the title of Miss District of Columbia USA 2022, and reached the top 16 at Miss USA 2022. Representing Greater Accra, Porter won Miss Grand Ghana 2025 on August 16, 2025 at The National Theatre, Accra, against 12 other contestants. She was crowned by Sage-La'Parriea Yakubu. Porter represented Ghana at Miss Grand International 2025 held in Thailand on October 18, 2025 and was third runner-up, the country's highest position to date.

Awards and achievements
Preceded by None	MGI All Stars 1st Runner-Up; 1st Edition	Succeeded by Incumbent
Preceded by Susana Medina, Spain (Assumed)	Miss Grand International 3rd Runner-Up; 2025	Succeeded by Ximena Carrillo, Guatemala
Preceded by Sasha Perea	Miss District of Columbia USA; 2022	Succeeded by Cassie Baloue
