= Abena Appiah =

Ghanaian-American singer, model and beauty queen

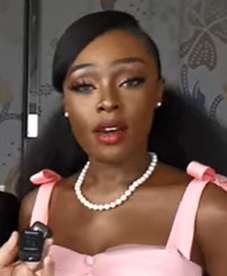
- Abena Appiah in 2021
- Born: Evelyn Abena Akuaba Appiah; June 2, 1993 (age 33); Accra, Ghana
- Education: Radford University College; Fashion
- Height: 1.78 m (5 ft 10 in)
- Beauty pageant titleholder
- Title: Top Model Ghana 2013; Miss Universe Ghana 2014; Queen Beauty Universe 2016; Miss Earth Ghana 2019; Miss Grand USA 2020; Miss Grand International 2020
- Hair color: Black
- Eye color: Brown
- Major competitions: Miss Universe 2014 (Unplaced); Miss Earth 2019 (Top 20); Miss Grand International 2020 (Winner)

Evelyn Abena Akuaba Appiah (born June 2, 1993) is a Ghanaian–American singer, model and beauty queen who was crowned Queen Beauty Universe 2016 and Miss Grand International 2020. She was appointed as Miss Grand USA and became the first Black woman to win the Miss Grand International crown. She previously represented Ghana in two of the Big Four international beauty pageants but lost in Miss Universe 2014 and Miss Earth 2019.

== Early career ==
Abena is also a singer who has released several singles, including "Akomah" (2015), "Earth" (2019), "No Hit and Run" (2019) and "No More Hate" (2021). She has worked as a model, appearing in music videos for "Wake Up in the Sky" sung by Bruno Mars, Gucci Mane and Kodak Black, as well as "El Anillo" by Jennifer Lopez.

== Pageantry ==
Abena started joining pageants when she won Top Model Ghana in 2013 and represented her country in Top Model of the World where she finished at top 15. The following year, she represented Ghana in Miss Universe 2014 but she was unplaced.

She joined Miss World America 2017 representing New York. After couple of years, she represented Ghana again at Miss Earth 2019, where she placed in the Top 20 and won several awards. She trained under the Kagandahang Flores camp, a Philippines-based pageant camp that trains aspiring beauty queens for local and international pageants.

=== Miss Grand International 2020 ===
She joined Miss Grand USA 2020, where she was hailed as the winner and the first African-American to win the title. She eventually crowned as the winner of Miss Grand International 2020 by the outgoing titleholder Miss Grand International 2019, Valentina Figuera of Venezuela, on March 27, 2021, at Show DC Hall in Bangkok, Thailand making her the first woman from the United States to win the crown.

=== Placements ===
Competition	Placement	Location	Special Awards	Represented
Top Model Ghana 2013	Winner	Ghana		Accra, Ghana
Top Model of the World 2013	Unplaced	Red Sea, Egypt		Ghana
Miss Universe Ghana 2014	Winner	Accra, Ghana		Accra, Ghana
Miss Universe 2014	Unplaced	Florida, United States		Ghana
Queen Beauty Universe 2016	Winner	Spain		Ghana
Miss World America 2017	Top 16	Florida, United States	Top 10 – Top Model; Top 10 – Sports and Fitness	New York
Miss Earth Ghana 2019	Winner	Accra, Ghana		Accra, Ghana
Miss Earth 2019	Top 20	Manila, Philippines	Best in Evening Gown (Air); Best in Beach Wear (Air); Best in Talent (Air); Best in Resorts Wear (Air); Miss Vivo (Air); Miss Infinity Cosset (Air); Miss DOH Reg 5 (Air); People's Choice Award; Best in Philippine Terno; Miss Earth Flora 1st runner-up	Ghana
Miss Grand USA 2020	Appointed	New York		New York
Miss Grand International 2020	Winner	Bangkok, Thailand	Top 20 – Best in Swimsuit; Top 20 – How to eat Thai food in 2-minute Challenge	United States of America

== Filmography ==
Year	Country	Title	Genre	Role	Producer	Ref.
2007	United States	Deadmeat	Action	Extra		
2019	United States	Mino: A Diasporic Myth	Utopian fantasy	Zuri	Ashunda Norris	
2023	Nigeria	A Taste of Sin	Drama	May	Frank Rajah Arase	
2024	United States	Meri Mary Mari	Sci-Fi	Meri Mary Mari	Antoine Jackson	
2024	Nigeria	On Different Grounds		TBA	Mildred Okwo	

Awards and achievements
Preceded by (Venezuela) Valentina Figuera	Miss Grand International; 2020	Succeeded by (Vietnam) Nguyễn Thúc Thùy Tiên
Preceded by (Nevada) Emily Irene Delgado	Miss Grand USA; 2020	Succeeded by (North Carolina) Madison Callaghan
Preceded by Belvy Naa	Miss Earth Ghana; 2019	Succeeded by Emma Djentuh
Preceded by Hanniel Jamin	Miss Universe Ghana; 2014	Succeeded by Hilda Akua
