= Irene Dwomoh =

Ghanaian model

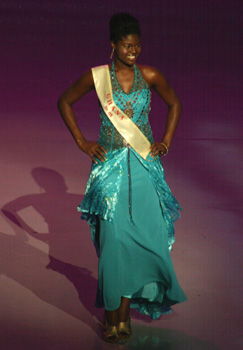
- Irene during Miss World 2007
- Born: Irene Dwomoh; 1986 (age 38–39); Essikadu, Sekondi-Takoradi, Ghana
- Beauty pageant titleholder
- Title: Miss Ghana 2006; Miss World 2007 (top 16)

Irene Dwomoh (born 1986) is a Ghanaian model and beauty pageant titleholder who was named Miss Ghana 2006 and represented Ghana in Miss World 2007 in China, where she won the talent competition and got a fast track to the semi-finals. She studied mathematics and statistics at the University of Cape Coast.
