= Top Model Ghana =

- Logo
- Starring: Kofi Capito; Abenaa; Thyron Adusu; Ivy Boakye Danquah-Adu; Wendy Smith-Walker; Joshua Ansah
- Country of origin: Ghana
- No. of episodes: 13

Production
- Executive producers: Max Menson; Flossy Menson
- Running time: 60 minutes
- Production companies: 702 Productions, Ltd.

Original release
- Network: GTV
- Release: August 13 – November 3, 2006

Top Model Ghana was a weekly one-hour reality television series produced by 702 Productions, Ltd., and was aired on GTV. Inspired by but not licensed by America's Next Top Model, the objective of this program was to raise the caliber of young models in the country and enhancing the international perception of Ghanaian models. The grand prize was a working opportunity with a California modeling agency which was won by Mabel in the first and so far only Cycle.

Auditions were held all through the state of Ghana where Ghanaians were called for casting. Applicants were required to be from 18 to 24 years old at the time of application and at least 5'7" in height, to be eligible to meet the character criteria as set by Producer.

For 10 weeks, the 13 finalists lived in a house equipped with cameras and microphones. They were also evaluated by a panel of judges on both their filmed interactions and performance in challenges. These judges, including fashion industry experts, photographers, agency representatives, and a weekly guest judge (to judge in his or her areas of expertise) will eliminate one contestant each week until a winner emerged.

Each episode targeted a particular life skill and modeling requirement. Contestant's knowledge and familiarity with subject matter were tested in a challenge. Aspiring models were evaluated based on their performance in the challenges.

In the final the top 6 competed against each other in a pageant-style ceremony where every remaining girl was awarded a title such as Top Model Personality or Top Model Unique. Before the winner was announced the top 2 was determined whereas the ranking order between the other four remained unknown. At the end of the Show Mabel triumphed over Caroline and won the title Top Model Ghana 2006.

== Series summary ==
Season	Premiere date	Winner	Runner-up	Other contestants in order of elimination	Number of contestants
1	August 13, 2006	Mabel Tettey	Caroline Sampson	Valentina, Charlene, Sabina, Esther, Delali, Patricia, Audrey, Elizabeth, Kate Techie Menson, Faila, Doris Adom-Asomaning	13

=== Contestants ===
(ages stated at start of contest)

Name	Age	Ranking	Title awarded at the final
Mabel Tettey	20	Winner	Top Model Unique
Caroline Sampson	22	Runner-up	Top Model Chique
Doris Adom-Asomaning	24	6th-3rd	Top Model Diva
Faila	24	6th-3rd	Top Model Unique
Kate Tachie-Menson	20	6th-3rd	Top Model Versatility
Elizabeth	20	6th-3rd	Top Model Personality
Audery	19	7th	Not eligible
Patricia	22	8th	Not eligible
Delali	22	9th	Not eligible
Esther	21	10th	Not eligible
Sabrina	23	11th	Not eligible
Charlene	24	12th	Not eligible
Valentina	19	13th	Not eligible

=== Call-out order ===
Abenaa’s callout order
Order	Weeks^{1}							
Order	1	2	3	4	5	6	7	8
1	Audrey	Patricia	Audrey	Patricia	Doris	Audrey	Caroline	Mabel
2	Patricia	Faila	Patricia	Faila	Mabel	Caroline	Doris	Caroline
3	Charlene	Mabel	Caroline	Caroline	Audrey	Doris	Faila	Doris
4	Caroline	Delali	Delali	Kate	Faila	Faila	Kate	Faila
5	Delali	Doris	Doris	Audrey	Kate	Kate	Mabel	Kate
6	Doris	Caroline	Faila	Elizabeth	Caroline	Mabel	Elizabeth	Elizabeth
7	Esther	Kate	Kate	Doris	Patricia	Elizabeth	Audrey	
8	Faila	Elizabeth	Mabel	Delali	Elizabeth	Patricia		
9	Kate	Audrey	Elizabeth	Mabel	Delali			
10	Mabel	Sabina	Esther	Esther				
11	Sabina	Esther	Sabina					
12	Elizabeth	Charlene						
13	Valentina							

The contestant was eliminated
The contestant won the competition

- In Week 8 was the final where only the top two was announced.
- ^{1}The number of weeks does not imply the number of episodes as the Show sometimes aired more often a week.
