= Valentina Figuera =

Venezuelan model and beauty pageant titleholder

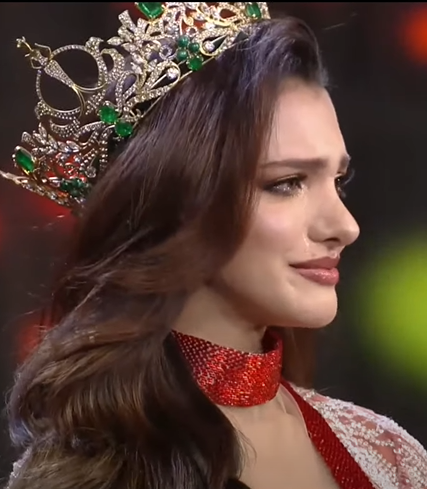
- Figuera in 2021
- Born: Puerto La Cruz, Venezuela
- Beauty pageant titleholder
- Title: Miss Grand Venezuela 2019; Miss Grand International 2019
- Major competitions: Miss Grand Venezuela 2019 (Winner); Miss Grand International 2019 (Winner)

Valentina Figuera is a Venezuelan model and beauty pageant titleholder who won Miss Grand International 2019. She is the first Venezuelan woman to win the Miss Grand International title.

== Personal life ==
Figuera was born in Puerto La Cruz, and has a twin sister. She is a model and also an architecture student at Santiago Mariño Polytechnic University Institute in Puerto La Cruz.

== Pageantry ==
=== El Concurso by Osmel Sousa 2018 ===
In 2018, Figuera and her twin sister participated in El Concurso by Osmel Sousa; a Venezuelan beauty contest and reality show. Figuera won the competition and rose to Miss Grand International 2019 as a contestant.

=== Miss Grand International 2019 ===
Figuera represented Venezuela and won Miss Grand International 2019,on 25 October 2019 at the Poliedro de Caracas in Caracas, Venezuela. She was crowned by outgoing titleholder Miss Grand International 2018, Clara Sosa of Paraguay.

On March 27, 2021, in Bangkok, Thailand, Figuera crowned Abena Appiah from the United States as her successor.

Awards and achievements
| Preceded by Annis Álvarez, Falcón | Miss Grand Venezuela; 2019 | Succeeded by Eliana Roa, Táchira |
| Preceded by Paraguay Clara Sosa | Miss Grand International; 2019 | Succeeded by United States Abena Appiah |
