= Hanniel Jamin =

Ghanaian singer

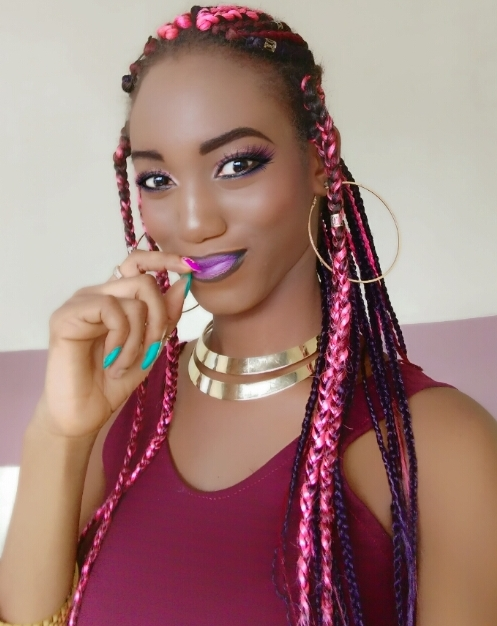
- Born: Hanniel Jamin; 1994 (age 31–32); Accra, Ghana
- Height: 1.76 m (5 ft 9 1/2 in)
- Beauty pageant titleholder
- Title: Miss Universe Ghana 2013
- Hair color: Black
- Major competitions: Miss Universe Ghana 2013 (Winner); Miss Universe 2013

Hanniel Jamin (born 1994) is Ghanaian singer, model, dancer and beauty pageant titleholder who was crowned Miss Universe Ghana in 2013, and represented Ghana at the Miss Universe 2013 pageant.

== Early life ==
Jamin is a Model, Singer, and up-coming musical artiste. She graduated from one of the best Universities in Ghana.

== Miss Universe Ghana 2013 ==
Hanniel Jamin was crowned Miss Universe Ghana 2013 at the end of the pageant held at the La Palm Royal Hotel in Accra on Friday May 24, 2013.

== Miss Universe 2013 ==
Jamin represented Ghana at Miss Universe 2013 in Moscow, Russia on November 9, 2013, where she competed to succeed Olivia Culpo but failed to place in the semifinals.

== Kidnapping ==
On Tuesday, September 3, 2013, Jamin was kidnapped in Accra for several hours. She was later released but her belongings were stolen.

Awards and achievements
Preceded by Gifty Ofori	Miss Universe Ghana; 2013	Succeeded by Abena Appiah
