= Frances Takyi-Mensah =

Frances Tekyi-Mensah
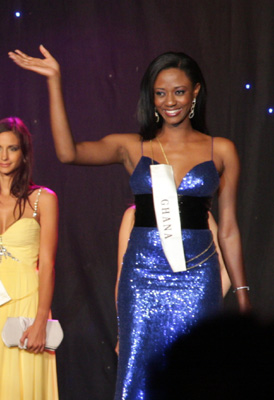
- Born: Frances Tekyi-Mensah; 1986 (age 39–40); Tema, Ghana
- Beauty pageant titleholder
- Title: Miss Ghana 2007

Frances Tekyi-Mensah (born 27 March 1986) is a Ghanaian British accountant and beauty pageant titleholder who represented Ghana in Miss World 2008 in South Africa. Born in Tema, Greater Accra Region, she is the youngest of four sisters. She has a bachelor's degree in Psychology and is a Certified Chartered Accountant, living and working in London, United Kingdom.
