= Alavanyo =

Coordinates: 5°47′N 0°34′E

- Interactive map of Alavanyo
- Country: Ghana
- Region: Volta Region
- Hohoe Municipal: Ewe

Government
  - Paramount Chief: Togbegã Tsedzẽ Atakroa VII

Alavanyo is a town in the Volta Region of Ghana. As a state, it consists of seven towns. Namely, Kpeme, Wudidi, Agorxoe, Abehenase, Agorme, Deme, Dzogbedze. The town is known for their development and the hard work of the youth in putting their town/Community on the map. Alavanyo Secondary School and E.P Technical Vocational Institute. The school is a second cycle institution.

On November 21, 2020 the President of the Republic, Nana Addo Dankwa Akufo-Addo commissioned Ghana's first micro power generating station. It is located at Tsatsadu, Alavanyo in the Hohoe constituency of the Volta Region. The power station is a hydropower generating station capable of 45kw and is meant to help economic development in the area.
