= Clara Sosa =

Paraguayan model and beauty pageant titleholder

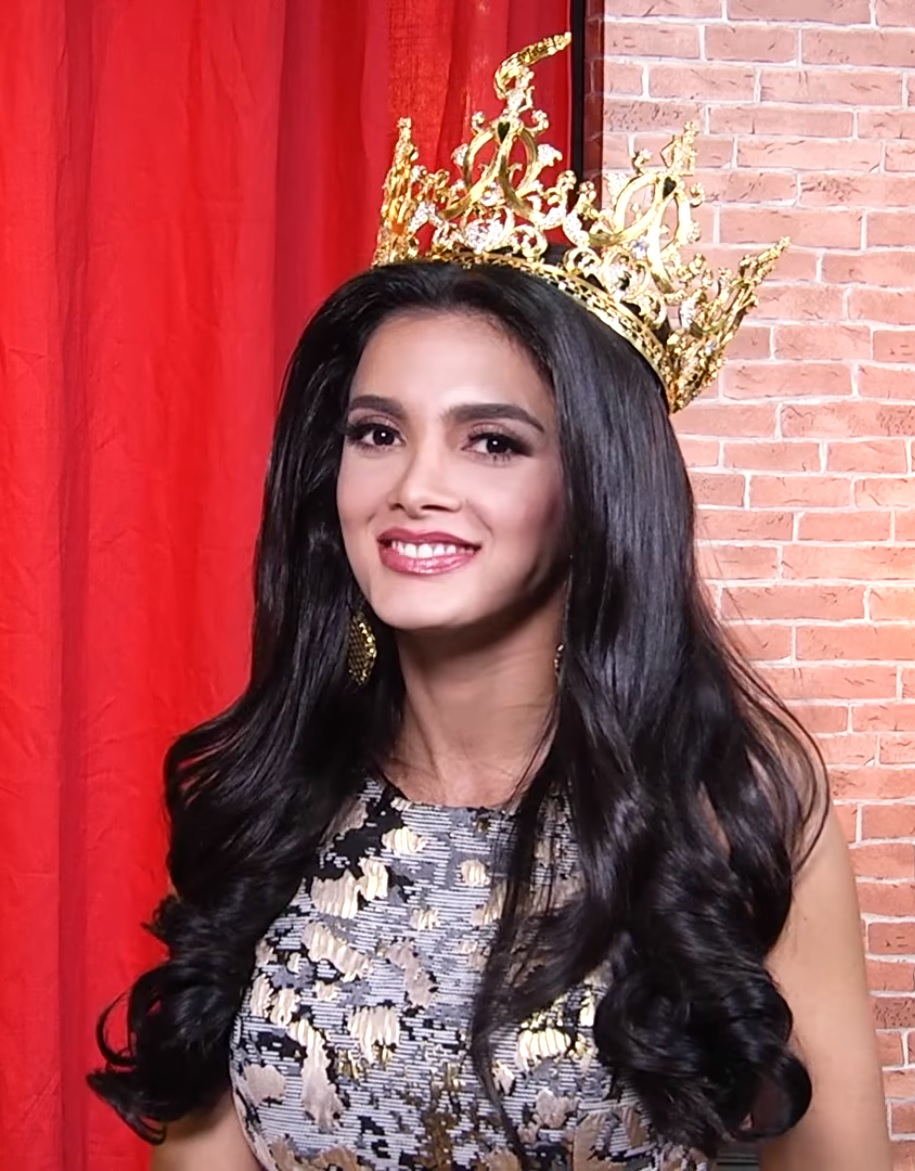
- Sosa in 2018
- Born: Asunción, Paraguay
- Beauty pageant titleholder
- Title: Miss Grand Paraguay 2018; Miss Grand International 2018
- Major competitions: Miss Model of the World 2015 (Top 20); Miss Expo 2016 (Winner); Miss Grand Paraguay 2018 (Winner); Miss Grand International 2018 (Winner)

Clara Sosa is a Paraguayan model, tv host and beauty pageant titleholder who won Miss Grand Paraguay 2018 and Miss Grand International 2018 in Yangon, Myanmar.

== Early life and career ==
Clara Sosa was born in the capital of Paraguay, Asunción, and raised in San Lorenzo. She is a model at ON Management and also a host at the morning show La mañana de Unicanal.

== Pageantry ==
In 2015, Sosa reached the top 20 at Miss Model of the World 2015. Sosa won Miss Grand Paraguay 2018, on 9 June 2018, at the Hotel Guaraní Theatre.

Sosa won Miss Grand Paraguay and was crowned Miss Grand International 2018 on 25 October 2018 at the One Entertainment Park in Yangon, Myanmar by outgoing titleholder Miss Grand International 2017, María José Lora of Peru. She is the first titleholder from Paraguay and the second from South America. She is the first Paraguayan woman to win the Miss Grand International title.

Awards and achievements
Preceded by Lia Ashmore, Guairá	Miss Grand Paraguay; 2018	Succeeded by Milena Rodríguez, Itapúa
Preceded by Peru María José Lora	Miss Grand International; 2018	Succeeded by Venezuela Valentina Figuera
