= Miss Grand Florida =

State-level pageant in the United States

- Formation: November 23, 2014; 11 years ago
- Founder: Suzi Hosfeld
- Type: Beauty pageant
- Headquarters: Miami
- Location: United States
- Official language: English
- Director: Jennifer Lovelace (2019–present)
- Parent organization: Golden Crown Productions
- Affiliations: Miss Grand USA
- Website: grandfloridapageants.com

Miss Grand Florida is a state-level female beauty pageant based in Florida, founded by Suzi Hosfeld in 2014. It is one of the preliminary stages for the Miss Grand USA national pageant. Since 2019, the competition license has belonged to a Miami-based event organizer, Golden Crown Productions, led by Haitian American nurse practitioner and radio personality, Jennifer Lovelace.

Florida has participated in the Miss Grand USA pageant since 2016 but has not won the contest yet. The highest placement obtained by Florida candidates at the national level was the 2nd runner-up, won in 2019 by Que Demery.

== Editions ==
The following table details Miss Grand California's annual editions since 2014.

Edition	Date	Final venue	Entrants	Winner	Ref.
1st	November 23, 2014	Orlando, Florida	N/A	Maicie Lynn Clark	
2nd	May 25, 2019	Art and Culture Center of Hollywood	14	Que Demery	
3rd	December 19, 2020	Krave Restaurant & Lounge, Sunrise	9	Isabella Logins	
4th	July 16, 2023	CUZ Miami Venue, Doral, Florida	6	Ivana Garcia	
5th	June 2, 2024	Teatro 8, Miami	9	Andrea Valentina	
6th	May 18, 2025	Wynwood Center, Wynwood, Miami	10	Shirley Ramirez	
7th	May 2, 2026	Black Box Media, Miami	12	Luisa Ganatios	

== National competition ==
The following is a list of representatives of the state of Florida in the Miss Grand USA national pageant.

Year	Representative	State qualification	Placement at Miss Grand USA	Ref.
2016	Stephanie Camacho	Appointment	Unplaced	
2017	Tyeshaa Hudson	Appointment	Top 10	
2018	No national pageant			
2019	Que Demery	Miss Grand Florida 2019 winner	2nd runner-up	
2020	No national pageant			
2021	Isabella Logins	Miss Grand Florida 2020 winner	Top 10	
2022	Florence Garcia	Appointment	Unplaced	
2023	Ivana Garcia	Miss Grand Florida 2023 winner	Top 10	
2024	Andrea Valentina	Miss Grand Florida 2024 winner	3rd runner-up	
2025	Shirley Ramirez	Miss Grand Florida 2025 winner	Top 10	
2026	Luisa Ganatios	Miss Grand Florida 2026 winner	Top 20	
