= Miss Grand New Jersey =

State-level pageant in the United States

- Formation: January 14, 2024; 2 years ago
- Founder: Rommel Turnbow Gopez
- Type: Beauty pageant
- Headquarters: Jersey City
- Location: United States
- Members: Miss Grand USA
- Official language: English
- Director: Rommel Turnbow Gopez (2023–Present)

Miss Grand New Jersey is a state-level female beauty pageant headquartered in Jersey City, New Jersey. The competition was established in 2024 and functions as a preliminary pageant for the Miss Grand USA national competition. Since 2023, the state franchise license has been held by entrepreneur Rommel Gopez.

New Jersey has participated in the Miss Grand USA pageant since 2016; however, during the initial years of its involvement, the state’s representatives were selected through appointments or casting processes rather than formal state competitions. The highest placement achieved by a New Jersey delegate at the national level is first runner-up, a distinction attained in 2024 by Tiajah Elliott.

== Editions ==
The following table details Miss Grand New Jersey's annual editions since 2024.

Edition	Date	Final venue	Entrants	Winner	Ref.
1st	14 Jan 2024	White Eagle Hall, Jersey City	7	Tiajah Elliott	
2nd	23 Feb 2025	Hamilton Stage, UCPAC, Rahway	12	Tavi Gandhi	
3rd	8 Mar 2026	Hamilton Stage, UCPAC, Rahway	7	Jacky Pineda	

== National competition ==
The following is a list of representatives of the state of New Jersey in the Miss Grand USA national pageant.

Year	Representative	State qualification	Placement at Miss Grand USA	State director	Ref.
2015	Kiana Harris	Appointment	No national pageant (Note: The country's representative for this year's international competition was instead determined via the Miss Earth USA 2015 pageant.)	Unknown	
2016	Karina Lopez	Appointment	Top 5	No licensee (Note: The state representative was assigned to the title by the national organizer)	
2017	No representative				
2018	No national pageant				
2019	Mayelin De La Cruz	Appointment	Top 10	No licensee	
2020	No national pageant				
No representatives in the 2021 and 2022 national pageants
2023	Christine Pierre	Appointment	Top 15	Rommel Gopez	
2024	Tiajah Elliott	Miss Grand New Jersey 2024 winner	1st runner-up	Rommel Gopez	
2025	Tavi Gandhi	Miss Grand New Jersey 2025 winner	Top 20	Rommel Gopez	
2026	Jacqueline Pineda	Miss Grand New Jerset 2026 winner	Top 10	Rommel Gopez	
