= Miss Grand US Virgin Islands =

Beauty pageant in US Virgin Islands

- Formation: March 25, 2024; 2 years ago
- Type: Beauty pageant
- Headquarters: Miami
- Location: United States
- Official language: English
- Current Titleholder: Brianna Stern
- Parent organization: Miss US Paradise (2014 – 2015); Miss Grand United States (2017); Miss Universe US Virgin Islands (2018); BJ Apparel (2023 – 2025)
- Affiliations: Miss Grand International
- Website: grandusvirginislands.store

Miss Grand US Virgin Islands is the national beauty pageant responsible for selecting representatives of the United States Virgin Islands to compete in the international contest, Miss Grand International. The title was first introduced in 2014, when Wilma Echandy, a 24-year-old Stateside Puerto Rican, was appointed to represent the territory at the Miss Grand International competition in Thailand. Under the directorship of Brian Javier, the first Miss Grand US Virgin Islands contest happened in 2024.

From 2014 to 2015, the franchise for designating representatives of the United States Virgin Islands to Miss Grand International was held by the pageant Miss US Paradise, directed by Cyndee Frontal. During this period, the principal winners of Miss US Paradise were primarily assigned to the Miss World competition, while the franchise also enabled representation at Miss Grand International. In 2017, the license was transferred to Chantel Martínez, founder of Miss Grand United States, and in 2018 it passed to Lulu Orange, organizer of Miss Universe US Virgin Islands.

Since the first participation in 2014, the pageant has recorded a single placement at the international level: in 2024, Samantha Keaton achieved a Top 20 position at Miss Grand International.

== History ==
The United States Virgin Islands made its debut at Miss Grand International in 2014 when the director of Miss US Paradise, Cyndee Frontal, acquired the license and subsequently appointed a Puerto Rican American model, Wilma Echandy, to compete internationally in Thailand, but Echandy went unplaced. In the following year, former Miss World United States Virgin Islands 2013, Petra Cabrera, was assigned by the same licensee to compete and also was unplaced. The partnership between Miss US Paradise and Miss Grand International was later terminated in 2016.

After an absence in 2016, the license was purchased by the Miss Grand United States director, Chantel Martínez, who assigned the first runner-up of Miss Grand United States 2017, Brianna Key, to join the 2017 international stage in Vietnam. The license was then transferred to the Miss Universe US Virgin Islands in the following years and the vice-miss of such a contest was sent internationally.

== Edition ==
The first edition of the Miss Grand United States Virgin Islands pageant was held on March 25, 2024.

Edition	Date	Venue	Entrant	Winner	Ref.
1st	March 25, 2024	CUZ Miami Venue, Doral, Florida, United States	8	Samantha Keaton (Note: Later dethroned.)	

== International competition ==
The following is a list of the United States Virgin Islands' representatives at the Miss Grand International contest.

Year	Representative	National qualification	Competition performance		National director	Ref.
Year	Representative	National qualification	Placement	Other awards	National director	Ref.
2014	Wilma Echandy	Queen of Puerto Rico 2012	Unplaced	—N/a	Cyndee Frontal	
2015	Petra Cabrera	Miss U.S. Paradise World 2013	Unplaced	—N/a	Cyndee Frontal	
2016	No representative					
2017	Brianna Key	1st runner-up Miss Grand United States 2017	Unplaced	—N/a	Chantel Martínez	
2018	Morgan Evans	1st runner-up Miss Universe U.S. Virgin Islands 2018	Unplaced	—N/a	Lulu Orange	
No representatives from 2019 to 2022
2023	Heather Thompson	Finalist Miss Grand United States 2019	Unplaced	—N/a	Brian Javier	
2024	Samantha Keaton	Miss Grand United States Virgin Islands 2024	Top 20	—N/a	Brian Javier	
2025	Giselle Burgos	4th runner-up Miss Grand United States 2024	Unplaced	—N/a	Brian Javier	
2026	Brianna Stern	Appointed	TBA	TBA	Brian Javier	

== Winners' gallery ==
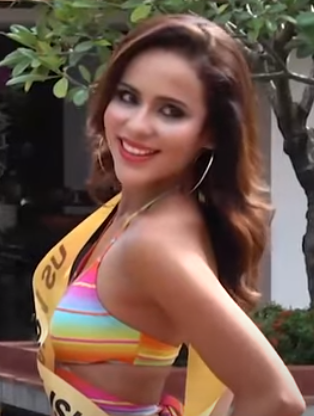
Wilma Echandy
Miss Grand US Virgin Islands 2014

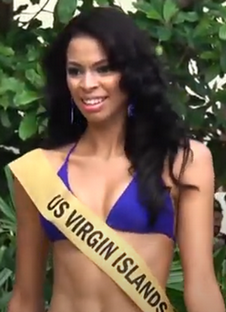
Petra Cabrera
Miss Grand US Virgin Islands 2015

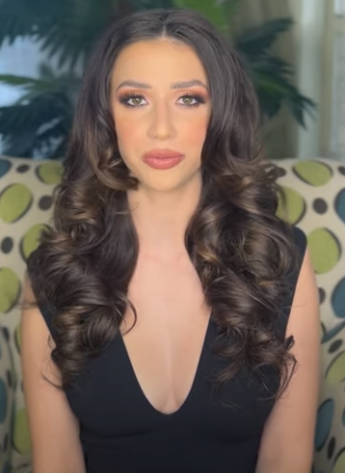
Heather Thompson
Miss Grand US Virgin Islands 2023

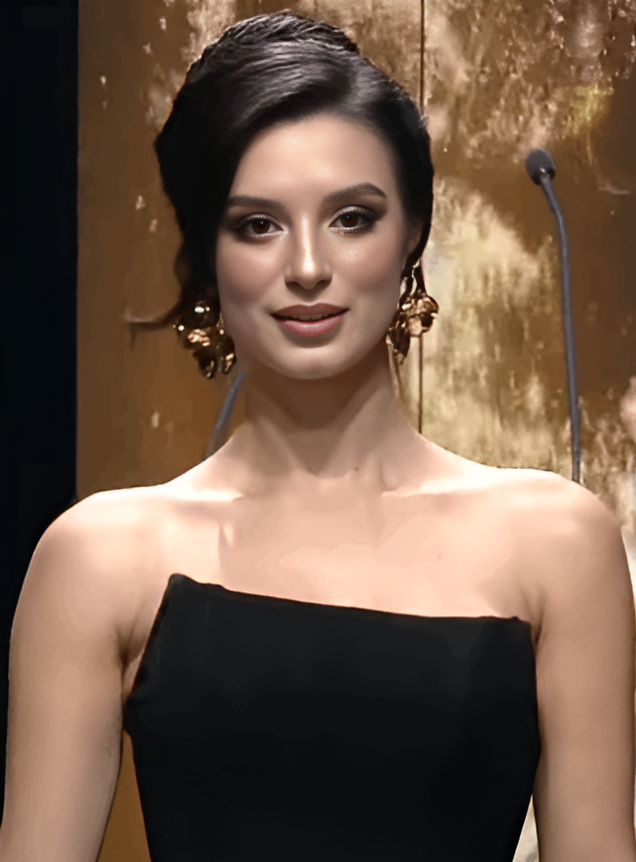
Samantha Keaton
Miss Grand US Virgin Islands 2024 (Dethroned)

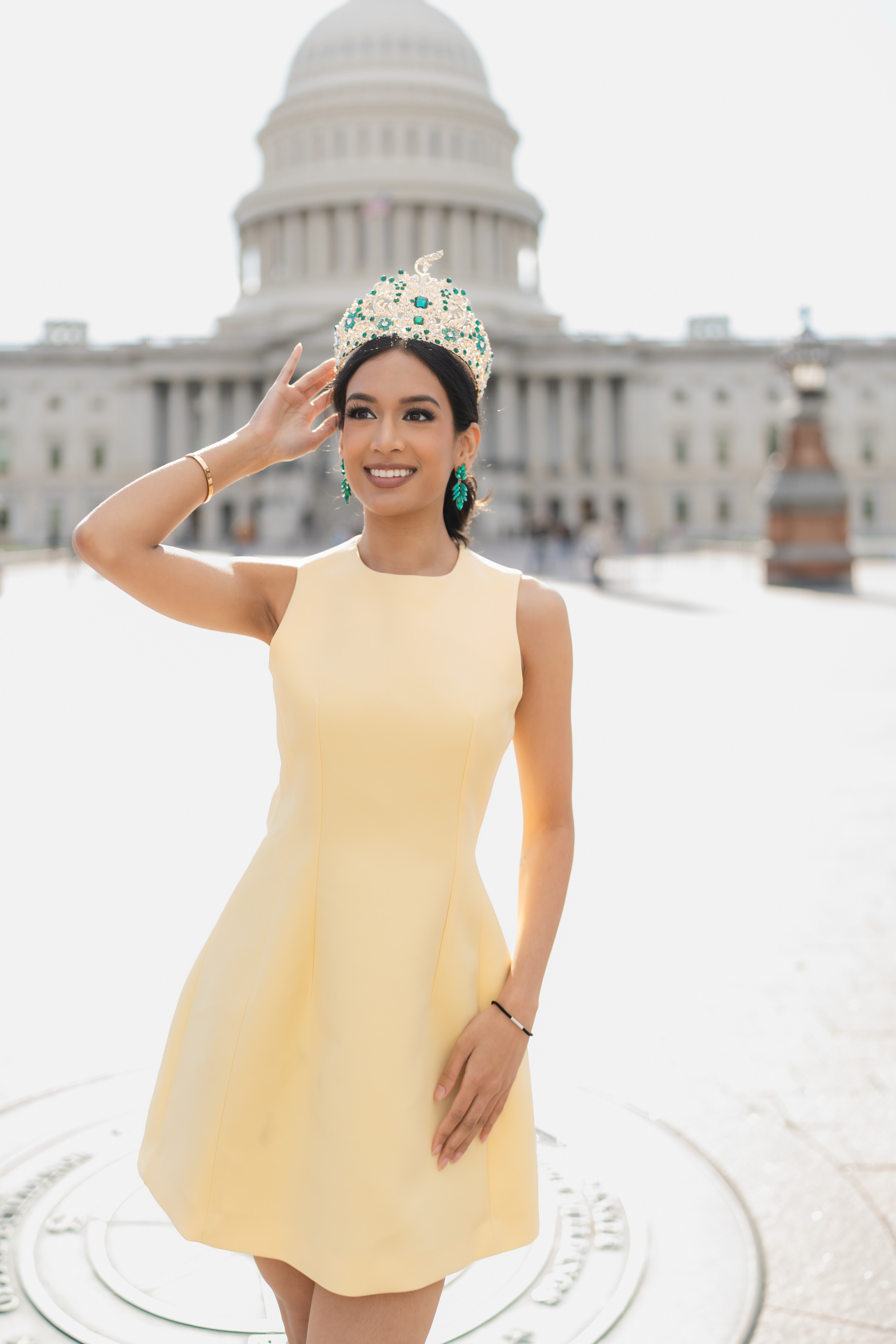
Shriya Boppana
1st runner-up Miss Grand US Virgin Islands 2024

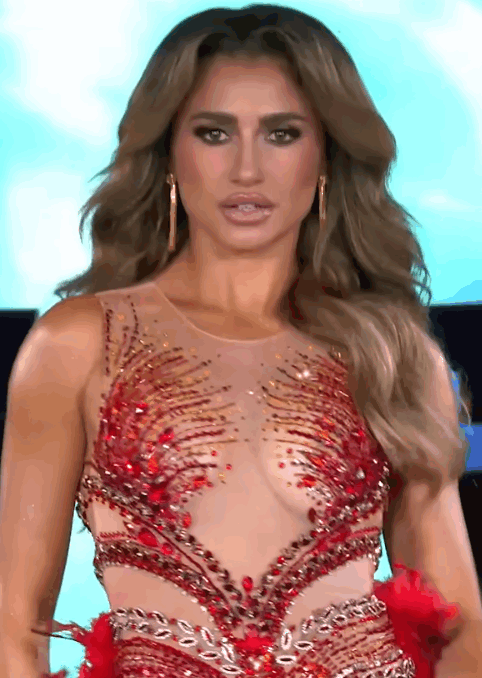
Giselle Burgos
Miss Grand US Virgin Islands 2025

Brianna Stern
Miss Grand US Virgin Islands 2026

== National finalists ==
The following list is the national finalists of the Miss Grand US Virgin Islands pageant, as well as the competition results. Eight contestants competed in the pageant's first edition held in Doral, Florida, the United States.

Miss Grand United States Virgin Islands 2024 competition result by division
Color key:
Winner	Top 5
1st runner-up	Unplaced
2nd runner-up	Withdrew
No representative

Year Represented	2024
Barrett	Emma Knapp (Withdrew)
Christiansted	Shriya Boppana (1st RU)
Cinnamon Bay	Sonika Komal (Top 5)
Coral Bay	Samantha Keaton (Winner) (Dethroned)
Frederiksted	Brianna Lopez
Kingshill	Rebecca Arianna
Red Hook	Kathyria Burgos
Reef Bay	London Tucker (2nd RU)
Saint Thomas	Alayzia Christopher (Top 5)
Water Island	Layel Hamchou (Withdrew)
Total	8

== See also ==
- Miss Virgin Islands
- Miss US Virgin Islands
