= Miss Grand Texas =

State-level pageant in the United States

- Formation: March 14, 2020; 6 years ago
- Founder: Marcelo Modesto
- Type: Beauty pageant
- Headquarters: Houton
- Location: United States
- Members: Miss Grand USA
- Official language: English
- Director: Leslie Galareta (2025 - now)
- Parent organization: ML Productions (2025 - now)

Miss Grand Texas is a state-level beauty pageant in Texas, established in 2020 to select the state's representative for the national Miss Grand USA pageant. From 2020 to 2024, the pageant license was held by the Houston-based event organizer Universal Misses Media (UMM), led by Marcelo Modesto.

Texas has participated in the Miss Grand USA pageant since 2016. Before the establishment of the state pageant, its representatives were either appointed or selected through casting processes. The state's highest placement at the national competition is third runner-up, achieved by Sydney Salinas in 2021 and Francie Millan in 2023, respectively.

== Editions ==
The following table details Miss Grand Texas's annual editions since 2020.

Edition	Date	Final venue	Entrants	Winner	Ref.
1st	March 14, 2020	Sugar Land Auditorium, Sugar Land	8	Sydney Salinas	
2nd	November 13, 2021	Urban Creative Auditorium, Houston	6	Juanita Maldonado	
3rd	November 19, 2022	Box Creative, Houton	14	Francie Millan	
4th	January 12, 2024	Sheraton Brookhollow Hotel, Houston	8	Karina Ramirez	
5th	June 29, 2025	9PM Music Venue, Houston	18	Lieve Blanckaert	
6th	May 24, 2026	9PM Music Venue, Houston	11	Christa Villafranca	

== National competition ==
The following is a list of representatives of the state of Texas in the Miss Grand USA national pageant.

Year	Representative	State qualification	Placement at Miss Grand USA	State director	Ref.
2016	Alaina Pereyna	Appointment	Unplaced	No licensee (Note: The state representative was assigned to the title by the national organizer)	
2017	Courtney Newman	Appointment	Top 10	No licensee	
2018	No national pageant				
2019	Anastasia Semenova	Appointment	Top 10	Marcelo Modesto	
2020	No national pageant				
2021	Sydney Salinas	Miss Grand Texas 2020 winner	3rd runner-up	Marcelo Modesto	
2022	Juanita Maldonado	Miss Grand Texas 2022 winner	Top 6	Marcelo Modesto	
2023	Francie Millan	Miss Grand Texas 2023 winner	3rd runner-up	Marcelo Modesto	
2024	Karina Ramirez	Miss Grand Texas 2024 winner	Top 8	Marcelo Modesto	
2025	Lieve Blanckaert	Miss Grand Texas 2025 winner	Top 20	Leslie Galareta	
2026	Natalie Gonzalez (Note: Originally named the runner-up of Miss Grand Texas 2026, but was promoted to the title after the original winner, Christa Villafranca, was unable to compete at the national pageant.)	Runner-up Miss Grand Texas 2026	Top 20	Leslie Galareta	
