= Miss US Virgin Islands =

Beauty contest

Miss US Virgin Islands Organization
- Formation: 1956; 70 years ago
- Type: Beauty pageant
- Headquarters: Charlotte Amalie
- Location: United States Virgin Islands
- Official language: English
- National Director: Jaielean Jagrup
- Affiliations: Miss Universe; Miss World; Miss International; Miss Earth; Miss Supranational; Miss Cosmo
- Website: missuniverseunitedstatesvirginislands.com

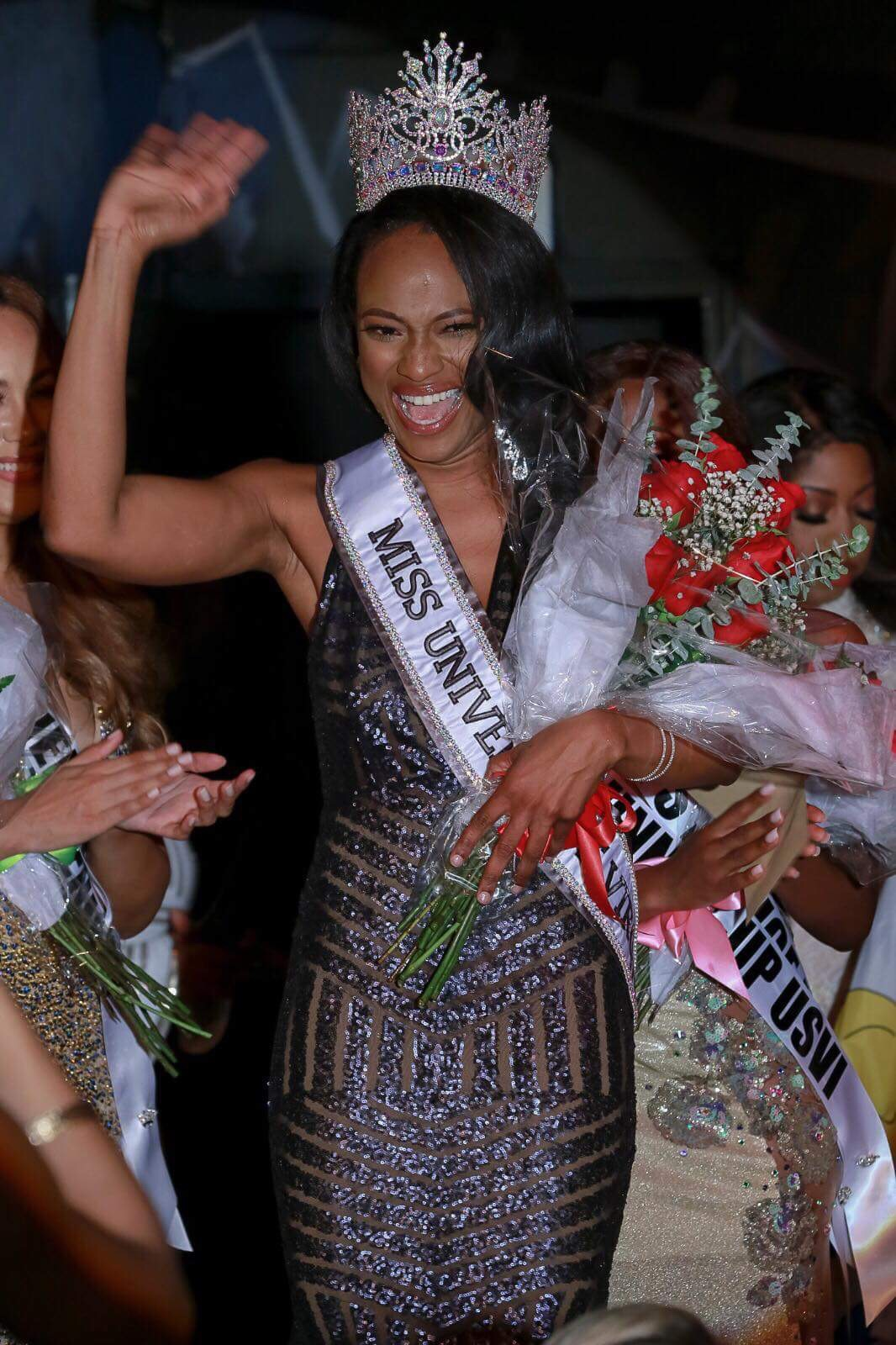
Aniska Tonge, 2018 winner

Miss US Virgin Islands is a beauty pageant in the US Virgin Islands.

== History ==
Between 1961 and 1978, the National Committee of Virgin Islands celebrated Miss Virgin Islands contest, in which the grand winners competed at the Miss Universe and other beauty pageants. Beginning in 1979, the official name changed to Miss US Virgin Islands.

== Franchise ownership and extended history ==
The Miss U.S. Virgin Islands competition began in 1956 when Miriam Edna Golden was crowned as the first Miss Virgin Islands in June 1956 (sponsored by Virgin Islands Hotel Association.) In 1961 was the second edition of Miss Virgin Islands, which saw the first international delegate Priscilla Bonilla representing the territory at Miss Universe 1961 in the United States. The pageant was then owned by Sam King (Owner of Pan American Finishing School) and the U.S. Virgin Islands Carnival Committee.

In franchise history, Cherrie Raphaelia Creque has been the only Miss Universe U.S. Virgin Islands to place in the Top 12 at Miss Universe. The only other international pageant finalist from the U.S. Virgin Islands has been Esonica Veira of St. Thomas, who was awarded 4th Runner up in Miss Supranational in Minsk, Belarus in September 2013.

Through the 1990s, franchise ownership of the Miss US Virgin Islands title belonged to The Lions Club of St. Thomas and also to Debra Gottlieb; a local staple in pageantry. In 2017, the Miss Universe U.S. Virgin Islands franchise was granted the license to Miss Universe Organization led by Lulu Orange Tyson of Lulu Orange, Inc. There was no known license holder of the Miss Universe U.S. Virgin Islands franchise pageant from 2020 to 2023. As of 2024, the franchise ownership transferred to Jaielean Jagroup with the main winner of the Miss USVI pageant going to Miss Universe in 2024 and 2025.

== Titleholders ==
Year	Miss US Virgin Islands	Notes
Miss Virgin Islands
1956	Miriam Edna Golden	Semifinalist at Miss United States
1961	Priscila Bonilla	1st Runner-up Miss St Croix. Sam King purchased Miss Universe franchise for USVI
1962	Juanita Monell Poblete	
1967	Gail Garrison	
1968	Elodie Sadie Sargeant	Virgin Islands Festival Queen 1967
1971	Cherrie Raphaelia Creque	Miss Cariba 1971
1972	Carol Krieger	
1973	Cindy Richards	
1974	Thelma Yvonne Santiago	
1975	Julia Florencia Wallace	
1976	Lorraine Patricia Baa	
1977	Denise Naomi George	
1978	Barbara Henderson	
Miss US Virgin Islands
1979	Linda Torres	
1980	Deborah Velisa Mardenborough	
1981	Marise James	
1982	Ingerborg Hendricks	
1983	Julie Elizabeth Woods	
1984	Patricia Maria Graham	
1985	Mudite Alda Henderson	
1986	Jasmine Olivia Turner	
1987	Feliza Ramone Bencosme	
1988	Heather Carty	
1989	Nathalie Lynch	
1991	Monique Lindesay	The Lions Club of St. Thomas held the Miss US Virgin Islands — Debra Gottlieb, Helen Hart, Denise Green Directorship
1992	Cathy-Mae Sitaram	
1993	Sheryl Simpson	
1995	Kim Marie Ann Boschulte	
1997	Vania Thomas	
1998	Leah Webster	
1999	Sherece Shurmain Smith	Miss US Virgin Islands "The Essence of the Caribbean", held at Wyndham Sugar Resorts, St. Thomas
2001	Lisa Hasseba Wynne	
2002	Merlisa Rhonda George	
2005	Tricia Homer	
2006	JeT’aime Cerge Grant	
2007	Renata Christian	Sponsored by Department of Tourism
2010	Janeisha John	
2011	Alexandrya Evans	
2014	Angela Gabriel	Did not compete at Miss Universe 2014 due to injury.
2016	Carolyn Carter	Tom Youth from US Ventures LLC. Directorship
2017	Esonica Veira	Lulu Orange Tyson Directorship
2018	Aniska Tonge	Cynthia Jerry, CEO of Miss Virgin Islands Scholarship Pageant, directorship
2019	Andrea Piecuch	Lulu Orange Tyson Directorship
2023	Madison Ramsingh	Jaielean Jagroup Directorship
2024	Stephany Andujar	Jaielean Jagroup Directorship
2025	Britanny Robinson	Jaielean Jagroup Directorship

== Representatives at Big Ten international pageants ==
=== Miss Universe US Virgin Islands ===
- : Declared the Winner
- : Finished as a runner-up or top 5/6 qualification
- : Finished as one of the finalists or semifinalists
- : Finished as a special awards winner

The winner of Miss US Virgin Islands represents the U.S territory at the Miss Universe. Between 1961 and 1978 Miss Virgin Islands winners went to Miss Universe with a Virgin Islands sash before a constitutional referendum was declared. On March 6, 1979 the queen was officially referred to as Miss U.S Virgin Islands. The Miss US Virgin Islands represents the islands to Miss Universe. The celebration of Miss US Virgin Islands was not held in 2000, 2003-2004, 2008-2009, 2012-2013, and in 2015. It made a return in 2016.

Year	Miss US Virgin Islands	Placement at Miss Universe	Special Awards	Notes
2026	Jenna-Monét Queeley	TBA	TBA	
2025	Britanny Robinson	Unplaced		
2024	Stephany Andujar	Unplaced		Jaielean Jagroup Directorship
Did not compete between 2020—2023
2019	Andrea Piecuch	Unplaced		Lulu Orange Tyson Directorship
2018	Aniska Tonge	Unplaced		Cynthia Jerry, CEO of Miss Virgin Islands Scholarship Pageant, directorship
2017	Esonica Veira	Unplaced		Lulu Orange Tyson directorship — Esonica was 4th Runner-up at Miss Supranational 2013 and Top 15 at Miss World 2011.
2016	Carolyn Carter	Unplaced	Best National Costume (Top 12)	Tom Youth from US Ventures LLC. directorship.
2015	Did not compete			
2014	Angela Gabriel	Did not compete		Gabriel was set to fly to Florida to compete at Miss Universe but withdrew after she suffered an arm injury.
Did not compete between 2012—2013
2011	Alexandrya Evans	Unplaced		
2010	Janeisha John	Unplaced		
Did not compete between 2008—2009
2007	Renata Christian	Unplaced		Sponsored by Department of Tourism
2006	JeT’aime Cerge Grant	Unplaced		
2005	Tricia Homer	Unplaced	Miss Congeniality	
Did not compete between 2003—2004
2002	Merlisa Rhonda George	Unplaced	Miss Congeniality	
2001	Lisa Hasseba Wynne	Unplaced		
2000	Did not compete			
1999	Sherece Shurmain Smith	Unplaced		Miss US Virgin Islands "The Essence of the Caribbean", held at Wyndham Sugar Resorts, St. Thomas.
1998	Leah Webster	Unplaced		
1997	Vania Thomas	Unplaced		
1996	Did not compete			
1995	Kim Marie Ann Boschulte	Unplaced		
1994	Did not compete			
1993	Sheryl Simpson	Unplaced		
1992	Cathy-Mae Sitaram	Unplaced		
1991	Monique Lindesay	Unplaced	Miss Congeniality	The Lions Club of St. Thomas held the Miss US Virgin Islands — Debra Gottlieb, Helen Hart, Denise Green directorship.
1990	Did not compete			
1989	Nathalie Lynch	Unplaced		
1988	Heather Carty	Unplaced		
1987	Feliza Ramone Bencosme	Unplaced		
1986	Jasmine Olivia Turner	Unplaced		
1985	Mudite Alda Henderson	Unplaced		
1984	Patricia Maria Graham	Unplaced		
1983	Julie Elizabeth Woods	Unplaced		
1982	Ingerborg Hendricks	Unplaced		
1981	Marise Cecile James	Unplaced		
1980	Deborah Velisa Mardenborough	Unplaced		
1979	Linda Torres	Unplaced		
Miss Virgin Islands
1978	Barbara Henderson	Unplaced		
1977	Denise Naomi George	Unplaced		
1976	Lorraine Patricia Baa	Unplaced		
1975	Julia Florencia Wallace	Unplaced		
1974	Thelma Yvonne Santiago	Unplaced		
1973	Cindy Richards	Unplaced		
1972	Carol Krieger	Unplaced		
1971	Cherrie Raphaelia Creque	Top 12		
1971	Utta Williams	Did not compete		Utta scheduled to compete at Miss Universe but withdrew. Her runner-up, Cherrie Raphaelia Creque took over her participation.
Did not compete between 1969—1970
1968	Elodie Sadie Sargeant	Unplaced		
1967	Gail Garrison	Unplaced		Miss Virgin Islands — Sam King (Owner of Pan American Finishing School and carnival committee).
Did not compete between 1963—1966
1962	Juanita Monell Poblete	Unplaced		
1961	Priscila Bonilla	Unplaced		Sam King purchased Miss Universe franchise for Virgin Islands; Miss Virgin Islands — Virgin Islands Hotel association.
Did not compete between 1957—1960
1956	Miriam Edna Golden	Did not compete		Semifinalist at Miss United States beauty pageant — The Miss V.I competed at Miss United States, not Miss Universe.

=== Miss World US Virgin Islands ===
- : Declared the Winner
- : Finished as a runner-up or top 5/6 qualification
- : Finished as one of the finalists or semifinalists
- : Finished as a special awards winner

Between 1976 and 1980, it was unknown how the delegates representing the US territory were chosen. Between 1982 and 2005 the Miss American Virgin Islands went to Miss World. In 2010, the Miss World USVI committees appointed the delegate to Miss World 2010 in Sanya. From 2012-2016 the Miss US Paradise winner is the selected delegate to the Miss World pageant. In 2019, a separate pageant called Miss World USVI was held to select the delegate for the Miss World pageant.

Year	Miss World US Virgin Islands	Placement at Miss World	Special Awards	Notes
Did not compete since 2023—present
2021	Adisha Penn	Did not compete		
2020	Due to the impact of COVID-19 pandemic, no pageant in 2020			
2019	A'yana Phillips	Unplaced	Miss World Talent (Top 27)	Previously Miss BVI 2018.
Did not compete between 2017—2018
USVI Representatives from Miss US Paradise
2016	Kyrelle Thomas	Unplaced		
2015	Jahne Massac	Unplaced		
2014	Aniska Tonge	Unplaced		
2013	Petra Cabrera-Badia	Unplaced	Miss World Beach Beauty (Top 32)	
2012	Taiesa Annique Lashley	Unplaced	Miss World Talent (Top 25)	Miss US Paradise Organization — Cyndee's Models in the Isle directorship.
USVI Representative from Miss US Virgin Islands
2011	Esonica Veira	Top 15	Miss World Talent (Top 11); Beauty With a Purpose (Top 30); Miss World Beach Beauty (Top 36)	The 1st Runner-up of Miss US Virgin Islands represented the territory at Miss World 2011 — In 2011 the Miss US Virgin Islands franchised the Miss World license.
Miss World US Virgin Islands
2010	Carolyn Carter	Unplaced	Miss World Sport (Top 20)	American Virgin Islands changed name as US Virgin Islands — Cyndee's Models in the Isle has received the licensing rights to host the selection for the US Virgin Islands.
Miss American Virgin Islands — World / by wearing sash the "American Virgin Islands"
Did not compete between 2006 and 2009
2005	Kmisha-Victoria Counts	Top 15	Miss World Talent	
Did not compete between 2003 and 2004
2002	Hailey Cagan	Unplaced		
2001	Cherrisse Wood	Unplaced		
2000	Luciah Hedrington	Unplaced		
1999	Shani Afua Smith	Unplaced		
1998	Wendy Sanchez	Unplaced		
1997	Taisha Regina Gomes	Unplaced		
1996	Emoliere Williams	Unplaced		
1995	Roshini Nibbs	Unplaced		
1994	Jessalyn Pearsall	Unplaced		
1993	Suzanne Palermo	Unplaced		
1992	Leah Webster	Unplaced		
1991	Cheryl Leiba Milligan	Unplaced		
1990	Keima Akintobi	Unplaced		
1989	Vania Thomas	Top 10	Miss World Caribbean	
1988	Cathy-Mae Sitaram	Unplaced		
1987	Lisa Pitram	Unplaced		
1986	Carmen Rosa Acosta	Unplaced		
1985	Connie Mary Colaire	Unplaced		
1984	Sandy Lewis	Unplaced		
1983	Chandra Theresa Ramsingh	Unplaced		
1982	Benedicta Acosta	Unplaced		Miss American Virgin Islands.
Miss World Virgin Islands — official designation
1981	Did not compete			
1980	Palmira Frorup	Unplaced		
1979	Jasmine Olivia Turner	Unplaced		
1978	Enid d'Lores Francis	Unplaced		
1977	Did not compete			
1976	Denise La Franque	Unplaced		Miss World Virgin Islands — official designation from 1976 to 1980.

=== Miss Earth US Virgin Islands ===
- : Declared the Winner
- : Finished as a runner-up or top 5/6 qualification
- : Finished as one of the finalists or semifinalists
- : Finished as a special awards winner

Year	Miss Earth US Virgin Islands	Placement at Miss Earth	Special Awards	Notes
2024	Brianna McSween	Unplaced		
2023	Madison Ramsingh	Unplaced		
Did not compete between 2021—2022
2020	Isabella Bennett	Unplaced		
2019	Talisha White	Unplaced		
2018	Did not compete			
2017	Kaylee Carlberg	Unplaced		
Did not compete between 2015—2016
2014	Esonica Veira	Unplaced	(gold) Talent Competition; (gold) Teacher Challenge	
2013	Vanessa Mari Donastorg	Unplaced		
2012	Carolyn Carter	Unplaced	(gold) Evening Gown Competition; (bronze) Walk with M.E; (silver) I Love My Planet School Campaign	
USVI Representative from Miss US Virgin Islands
2011	Kara Williams	Unplaced		
Did not compete between 2008—2010
2007	JeT’aime Cheree Cerge	Unplaced		

=== Miss International US Virgin Islands ===
- : Declared the Winner
- : Finished as a runner-up or top 5/6 qualification
- : Finished as one of the finalists or semifinalists
- : Finished as aspecial awards winner

Year	Miss International US Virgin Islands	Placement at Miss International	Special Awards	Notes
2026	Alejandra Ranaudo	TBA		Directed by JDP Pageants
2025	Sikeza Chandra Fowlks	Unplaced	Preliminary Speech Top 3	Directed by JDP Pageants
Did not compete between 2013—2024
2012	Vanessa Mari Donastorg	Unplaced		The 1st Runner-up of Miss US Paradise represented the territory at Miss International 2012 — In 2012 the Miss US Paradise franchised the Miss International license.

=== Miss Supranational US Virgin Islands ===
- : Declared the Winner
- : Finished as a runner-up or top 5/6 qualification
- : Finished as one of the finalists or semifinalists
- : Finished as a special awards winner

Year	Miss Supranational US Virgin Islands	Placement at Miss Supranational	Special Awards	Notes
2024	Bria James	Unplaced		
Did not compete between 2021—2023
2020	Due to the impact of COVID-19 pandemic, no pageant in 2020			
2019	Destani Huffman-Jefferson	Unplaced		
2013	Esonica Viera	4th runner-up		

=== Miss Cosmo US Virgin Islands ===
- : Declared the Winner
- : Finished as a runner-up or top 5/6 qualification
- : Finished as one of the finalists or semifinalists
- : Finished as a special awards winner

Year	Miss Cosmo US Virgin Islands	Placement at Miss Cosmo	Special Awards	Notes
2025	Francely Lopez	Unplaced		Directed by Nakia Hardy‑Patterson
2024	London Tucker	Withdrew		2nd Runner-Up at Miss Grand US Virgin Islands 2024 represented the territory at Miss Cosmo 2024; Later Miss Petite International 2025 (represented United States).

=== Miss Grand US Virgin Islands ===
- : Declared the Winner
- : Finished as a runner-up or top 5/6 qualification
- : Finished as one of the finalists or semifinalists
- : Finished as a special awards winner

Year	Miss Grand US Virgin Islands	Placement at Miss Grand International	Special Awards	Notes
2024	Shriya Boppana			Originally crowned the 1st runner-up at Miss Grand US Virgin Islands 2024, assumed the winner after the original winner's reign was prematurely terminated
2023	Heather Thompson	Unplaced		Finalist Miss Grand United States 2019
Did not compete between 2019—2022
2018	Morgan Evans	Unplaced		1st runner-up Miss Universe U.S. Virgin Islands 2018
2017	Brianna Key	Unplaced		1st runner-up Miss Grand United States 2017
Did not compete in 2016
2015	Petra Cabrera	Unplaced		Miss U.S. Paradise World 2013
2014	Wilma Echandy	Unplaced		Queen of Puerto Rico 2012
