= Miss Grand US Virgin Islands 2024 =

1st Miss Grand US Virgin Islands, beauty pageant edition

Miss Grand United States Virgin Islands 2024
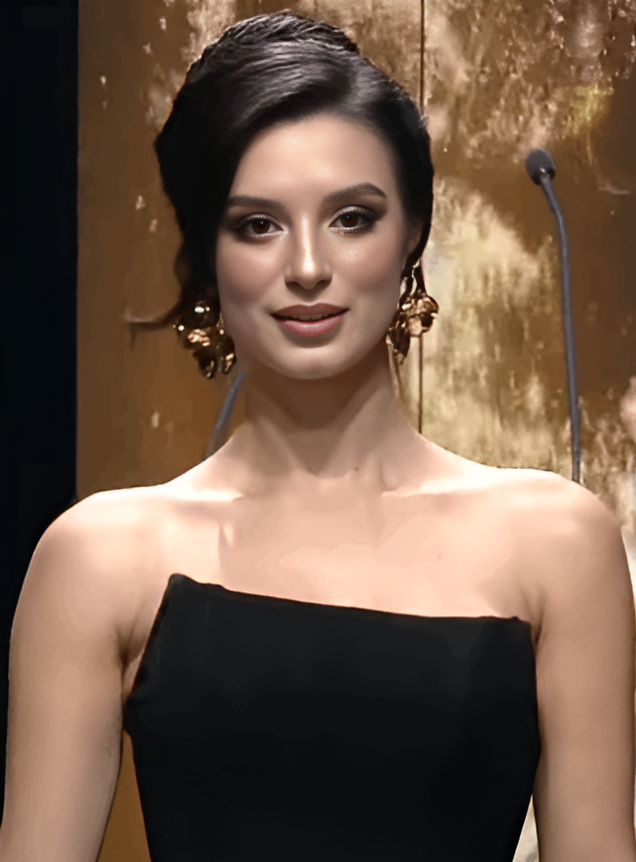
- Samantha Keaton, the dethroned winner
- Date: March 25, 2024
- Presenters: Shaquille Urie; Carisa Peart
- Venue: CUZ Miami Venue, Doral, Florida, United States
- Entrants: 8
- Placements: 5
- Debuts: Barrett; Christiansted; Cinnamon Bay; Coral Bay; Frederiksted; Kingshill; Red Hook; Reef Bay; Saint Thomas; Water Island
- Winner: Samantha Keaton (Coral Bay) (Dethroned)

Miss Grand United States Virgin Islands 2024 was the inaugural edition of the Miss Grand United States Virgin Islands pageant, held on March 25, 2024, at the CUZ Miami Venue, Doral, Florida, United States. Eight candidates from different cities and sub-districts competed for the title, of whom a 23-year-old model and former 1st runner-up Miss Grand United States 2023 representing Coral Bay, Samantha Keaton, was elected the winner, while the representatives of Christiansted, Shriya Boppana, and Reef Bay, London Tucker, were named the runners-up. The event was managed by Brian Javier of BJ Apparel, who has been the licensee of Miss Grand United States Virgin Islands since 2023.

Keaton represented the United States Virgin Islands in the Miss Grand International 2024 pageant, held in Thailand on October 25, 2024. and was placed among the top 20 finalists; however, Keaton was dethroned on October 26, 2024, abruptly following the international contest, due to contractual issues. Meanwhile, the 2nd runner-up, London Tucker, was sent to compete at Miss Cosmo 2024, but later withdrew.

== Background ==
After acquiring the license and appointing the representatives to compete internationally in 2023, the Miss Grand US Virgin Islands director, Brian Javier, announced in late 2023 that the first edition of the national contest would be held in early 2024 to select the territory representative for the Miss Grand International 2024 pageant in Myanmar. An application for such a national contest was virtually opened in November 2023, and the final 10 qualified finalists were later unveiled on January 15, 2024, with the grand final competition scheduled for March 25.

== Result ==
Miss Grand United States Virgin Islands 2024 competition result by division
Color key:
| Winner | Top 5 |
| 1st runner-up | Unplaced |
| 2nd runner-up | Withdrew |
No representative

| Placement | Candidate |
|---|---|
| Miss Grand United States Virgin Islands 2024 | Coral Bay – Samantha Keaton (Dethroned) |
| 1st runner-up | Christiansted – Shriya Boppana |
| 2nd runner-up | Reef Bay – London Tucker |
| Top 5 | Cinnamon Bay – Sonika Komal; Saint Thomas – Alayzia Christopher |

== Contestants ==
Eight contestants competed for the title.

- Christiansted – Shriya Boppana
- Cinnamon Bay – Sonika Komal
- Coral Bay – Samantha Keaton
- Frederiksted – Brianna Lopez
- Kingshill – Rebecca Arianna
- Red Hook – Kat Burgos
- Reef Bay – London Tucker
- Saint Thomas – Alayzia Christopher

Withdrawn contestants

- Barrett – Emma Knapp
- Water Island – Layel Hamchou
