= Miss Grand Uruguay =

Uruguayan beauty pageant title

- Formation: 2016
- Headquarters: Montevideo
- Location: Uruguay
- Members: Miss Grand International
- Official language: Spanish
- National directors: Candace Thomas; Sthephanie Miranda (2026)
- Parent organization: Miss Uruguay (2016); CNB Uruguay (2020); Miss Grand USA (2026)

Francie Millan, an Uruguayan candidate to Miss Grand International 2026

Miss Grand Uruguay is a Uruguay national beauty pageant that selects a contestant for Miss Grand International. The title was first awarded at Nuestra Belleza Uruguay 2016, where Mellina Carballo was given the title. The contest was organized by Nadia Cerri, who was also the director of Miss Uruguay. Another titleholder, Jimena Martino, won an audition held by the Certamen Nacional de Belleza Uruguay pageant (CNB Uruguay) in 2020.

Since the first Miss Grand International, Uruguay has competed twice; in 2016 and 2020. Both contestants were unplaced.

== History ==
Uruguay participated in Miss Grand International for the first time in 2016 when Nadia Cerri, the organizer of Miss Uruguay, obtained the Miss Grand Uruguay license and sent Melina Carballo to compete at Miss Grand International 2016 in Las Vegas. Melina was the vice-miss of a newly established national pageant, Nuestra Belleza Uruguay. Normally, Nadia Cerri holds another contest, Miss Uruguay, to select the country's representatives for the Miss Universe and Miss World pageants. However, after losing the Miss Universe license in 2016, Nadia instead organized Nuestra Belleza Uruguay as the replacement contest; its main winner was sent to Miss World 2016. The Miss Grand contract was not extended in the following years, causing the country to be absent from 2017 to 2019.

After three years, Uruguay returned to the pageant after Jimena Martino was assigned to represent the country at Miss Grand International 2020 held in Thailand in early 2021. Martino was to compete at Miss Tourism World 2020, in China; Due to the COVID-19 pandemic in the host country, the pageant was canceled. Martino instead applied to and won Miss Grand Uruguay 2020, organized by Yeisson Coronado's Certamen Nacional de Belleza Uruguay (CNB Uruguay). Martino was the first runner-up of Bendice la Corona Uruguay 2020, in which the pageant's main winner was sent to Miss World 2021.

With no national licensees, no Uruguay candidates have been at Miss Grand International since 2021.

== International competition ==
The following is a list of Uruguayan representatives at the Miss Grand International contest.

Year	Representative	National qualification	Competition Performance		National director(s)
Year	Representative	National qualification	Placement	Other awards	National director(s)
2016	Mellina Carballo	Nuestra Belleza Uruguay 2016 – Vice Reina	Unplaced	—N/a	Nadia Cerri
No representatives from 2017 to 2019
2020	Jimena Martino	1st runner-up Bendice la Corona Uruguay 2020	Unplaced	—N/a	Yeisson Coronado
No representatives from 2021 to 2025
2026	Francie Millan	2nd runner-up Miss Grand United States 2026	Top 25		Candace Thomas & Sthephanie Miranda
