= Miss Grand United States 2025 =

8th Miss Grand United States pageant

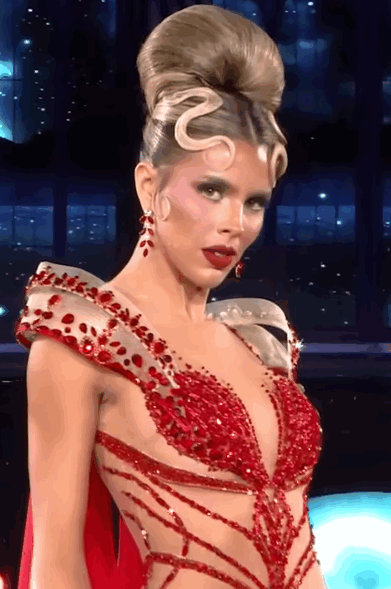
- Ivana Garcia, the winner of the contest
- Date: 18 August 2025
- Venue: Rio Showroom at Rio Las Vegas, Rio Hotel & Casino, Las Vegas, Nevada
- Director: Crown Legacy LLC
- Producer: Protagonist Live LLC
- Entrants: 31
- Placements: 20
- Debuts: Central New York; East Coast; Indiana; North Atlantic; Northern California; Silver State; South; Southern States; Wisconsin
- Returns: District of Columbia; Hawaii; Kentucky; Michigan; Ohio; Pennsylvania; Tennessee; West Coast
- Winner: Ivana Garcia; Ohio

External videos
- Miss Grand United States 2025 Finals
- 2025 Miss Grand USA Finals by Crown Legacy LLC

Miss Grand United States 2025 constituted the 8th edition of the Miss Grand USA national beauty pageant and was convened on 18 August 2025 at the Rio Showroom, located within the Rio Hotel & Casino in Las Vegas, Nevada. The competition featured contestants representing 31 states and regions across the United States, each vying for the national title.

The title was awarded to Ivana García, a 23-year-old model and philanthropist representing the state of Ohio. She was crowned by the outgoing titleholder, Miss Grand United States 2024, Cora Griffen of Georgia. Following her national victory, García represented the United States at the international parent competition, Miss Grand International 2025, which took place on 18 October 2025 in Bangkok, Thailand.

This 2025 edition was directed by Crown Legacy, LLC and produced by Protagonist Live LLC. The event was broadcast live to a global audience through the official YouTube channel of the international organization, Grand TV.

== Selection of contestants ==
The majority of contestants were appointed to their respective state titles by the national licensee. Only three states—Florida, New Jersey, and Texas—conducted state-level pageants for this year competition, representing a decrease from four such pageants held during the previous edition.

Pageant	Edition	Date	Final venue	Entrants	Ref.
Miss Grand New Jersey	2nd	23 Feb	Hamilton Stage, Union County Performing Arts Center, Rahway	12	
Miss Grand Florida	6th	18 May	Wynwood Center, Wynwood, Miami, Florida	10	
Miss Grand Texas	5th	29 Jun	9PM Music Venue, Houston	18	

== Results ==
Miss Grand USA 2025 competition results by state
Color key:
Winner	1st RU	2nd RU
3rd RU	4th RU	Top 10
Top 20	Unplaced	Withdrew
No representative		RU = Runner-up

Placement	Contestant
Miss Grand USA 2025	Ohio - Ivana Garcia
1st Runner-up	East Coast – Andrea Valentina Nuñez
2nd Runner-up	Washington – Rachelle Di Stasio
3rd Runner-up	Southern States – Christianah Adejokun
4th Runner-up	Tennessee – Emely Aleman
Top 10	Florida – Shirley Ramirez; New York – Perpetua Sermsup Smith; North Carolina – Janiya Pipkin; South – April Rodriguez; West Coast – Me-Kayla Brittany
Top 20	Central New York – Teona Kbilashvili; Colorado – Samantha Cardiel; Georgia – Chinelo Aniekwu; Hawaii – Sarah Kim Gross; Illinois – Woodarlie Toto; Michigan – Victoria Mercedes Ng; New Jersey – Tavi Gandhi; Texas – Lieve Blanckaert; Virginia – Maryah Watkins; Wisconsin – Emma Loney

== Contestants ==
These are the currently confirmed contestants:

State-level representatives Total: 23/51 states
State	Contestant
Arizona	Christine Nguyen
California	Paloma Pacheco
Colorado	Samantha Cardiel
District of Columbia	Kayla Stewart
Florida	Shirley Ramirez
Georgia	Chinelo Aniekwu
Hawaii	Sarah Kim Gross
Illinois	Woodarlie Toto
Indiana	Yadira Yardeli Muñoz
Kentucky	Alyssa Wright
Michigan	Victoria Mercedes Ng
Nevada	Starla Smith
New Jersey	Tavi Gandhi
New Mexico	Jade Vargas
New York	Perpetua Sermsup Smith
North Carolina	Janiya Pipkin
Ohio	Ivana Garcia
Pennsylvania	Djenne Jenn Fadiga
Tennessee	Emely Aleman
Texas	Lieve Blanckaert
Virginia	Maryah Watkins
Washington	Rachelle Di Stasio
Wisconsin	Emma Loney

Non-state representatives Total: 8 candidates
Locality	Contestant
Central New York	Teona Kbilashvili
East Coast	Andrea Valentina Nuñez
North Atlantic	Natasha Gisela
Northern California	Jiazi Gao
Silver State	Arielle Sharma
South	April Rodriguez
Southern States	Christianah Adejokun
West Coast	Me-Kayla Brittany
Withdrawals Total: 3 candidates
Alabama	Niricha Williams
Golden Coast	Melanie Wu
Maine	Vianney Cortez
