= Victoria Oluwakotanmi =

Nigerian-American beauty pageant titleholder

- Born: San Antonio, Texas, U.S.
- Education: Chemical Engineering
- Beauty pageant titleholder
- Title: Miss Black San Antonio 2020; Miss Grand Indiana 2026; Miss Grand United States 2026
- Major competitions: Miss Grand United States 2024 (2nd Runner-Up); Miss Grand United States 2026; (1st Runner-Up); Miss Grand International 2026 (Top 25)

Victoria Oluwakotanmi is a Nigerian-American beauty pageant titleholder who won Miss Grand Indiana 2026. Oluwakotanmi was appointed Miss Grand USA 2026 after the winner, Mekyla Li, was disqualified.

== Early life and education ==
Victoria Oluwakotanmi is of Yoruba Nigerian descent and grew up in San Antonio, Texas. She served in the United States Navy Reserve. She graduated with a degree in Chemical Engineering. She is also the co-founder of the organization Kiddos for STEM, an initiative aimed at promoting STEM education among young children.

== Pageantry ==
Oluwakotanmi won her first beauty pageant, Miss Black San Antonio 2020. She represented Illinois and was second runner up at Miss Grand United States 2024, and won the Best in Social Media award.

Oluwakotanmi was first runner up at Miss Grand United States 2026 on 10 August 2026, representing Indiana. She she also received the Best State Costume and Best in Swimsuit awards. On 21 August 2026, following the disqualification of the winner Mekyla Li, she was given the title. She represented the United States at Miss Grand International 2026 in Thailand and reached the top 25.

Awards and achievements
Preceded by Mekyla Li (disqualified)	Miss Grand USA; 2026	Incumbent
