= Miss Grand United States 2026 =

9th Miss Grand United States pageant

- Date: 10 August 2026
- Presenters: CJ Opiaza; Kangela Guerrero
- Entertainment: Faith Porter
- Venue: WOW Theater, Rio Hotel & Casino, Las Vegas, Nevada
- Entrants: 29
- Placements: 20
- Debuts: Utah; West Virginia
- Withdrawals: Colorado; Connecticut; Pennsylvania
- Returns: Alabama; Delaware; Louisiana; Maryland; Massachusetts; Oregon; Rhode Island; South Carolina
- Winner: Mekyla Li Bedwell; Massachusetts (Dethroned); Victoria Oluwakotanmi; Indiana (Assumed)
- Congeniality: Shelbi Byrnes, Nevada
- Photogenic: Tagan Vaz-Barros, Maryland

External videos
- Miss Grand United States 2026 Finals
- 2026 Miss Grand USA Finals by Crown Legacy LLC

Miss Grand United States 2026 was the ninth edition of the Miss Grand USA national beauty pageant, held on August 10, 2026, at the WOW Theater in the Rio Hotel & Casino, Las Vegas, Nevada. Representatives from 29 of the 50 U.S. states and the District of Columbia competed for the national title.

At the end of the event, outgoing titleholder Ivana Garcia of Ohio, Miss Grand United States 2025, crowned Mekyla Li Bedwell of Massachusetts as her successor. Bedwell was originally set to represent the United States at Miss Grand International 2026, scheduled to be held in India, but she was relieved of her duties one week later on August 19th, when it was discovered she had violated contractual policies outlined by the Miss Grand USA Organization. It was announced on August 20th that the runner-up Victoria Oluwakotanmi of Indiana would become the new Miss Grand USA.

Two runners-up also earned spots at international pageants. Second runner-up Francie Millan of Louisiana was named Uruguay's representative to Miss Grand International 2026, while third runner-up Shelbi Byrnes of Nevada was selected as the U.S. candidate for MGI All Stars 2nd Edition, having qualified through her previous international run at Miss International 2024, where she was placed in the Top 20.

== Selection of contestants ==
While most state representatives were appointed, some state directors organized state-level competitions to select their representatives. Details of these competitions are provided below.

Pageant	Edition	Date	Final venue	Entrants	Ref.
Miss Grand New Jersey	3rd	March 8, 2026	Hamilton Stage, UCPAC, Rahway	7	
Miss Grand Virginia	1st	April 4, 2026	Historical Ballroom, Deco at CNB, Richmond	14	
Miss Grand Maryland	1st	April 4, 2026	Historical Ballroom, Deco at CNB, Richmond	14	
Miss Grand D.C.	1st	April 4, 2026	Historical Ballroom, Deco at CNB, Richmond	14	
Miss Grand Florida	7th	May 2, 2026	Black Box Media, Miami	12	
Miss Grand California	3rd	May 9, 2026	Online pageant	9	
Miss Grand Texas	6th	May 24, 2026	9PM Music Venue, Houston	11	
Miss Grand Nevada	1st	June 21, 2026	The Space, Las Vegas	6	

== Results ==
=== Main placement ===
Miss Grand United States 2026 competition result by state
Color key:
Winner	1st RU	2nd RU
3rd RU	4th RU	Top 10
Top 20	Unplaced	Withdrew
No representative		RU = Runner-up

Placement	Contestant
Miss Grand United States 2026	Massachusetts – Mekyla Li Bedwell (Note: Automatically qualified for the Top 10 as Miss Fan Favorite awardee) (Dethroned)
Miss Grand United States 2026	Indiana – Victoria Oluwakotanmi (Assumed)
1st runner-up	Promoted to the winning title
2nd runner-up (Miss Grand Uruguay 2026)	Louisiana – Francie Millan (Note: Also named as Uruguay representative to the Miss Grand International 2026 pageant.)
3rd runner-up (Representing the USA in MGI All Stars 2nd Edition)	Nevada – Shelbi Byrnes (Note: Also named as the U.S. candidate to the MGI All Stars 2nd Edition.)
4th runner-up	New Mexico – Alma Gonzalez
5th runners-up	California – Keshia Lee; Delaware – Allison LaForce; New Jersey – Jacqueline Pineda; Ohio – Francis Malpica; Wisconsin – Victoria Mercedes Ng
Top 20	Alabama – Paula Uchenna Ezendu; Florida – Luisa Ganatios; Illinois – Whitney Victoria Powell; Maryland – Tagan Vaz-Barros; Michigan – Yadira Muñoz; New York – Arianna Nicolette Tice; Rhode Island – Maryah Watkins; Tennessee – Amanda Bell; Texas – Natalie Gonzalez; West Virginia – Phantasia Mason

=== Special awards ===
Award	Awardee
Miss Fan Favorite	Massachusetts – Mekyla Li Bedwell
Miss Congeniality	Nevada – Shelbi Byrnes
Miss Social Media	New Mexico – Alma Gonzalez
Miss Photogenic	Maryland – Tagan Vaz-Barros
Grand Pitch Award	Louisiana – Francie Millan
Grand Talent Award	New York – Arianna Nicolette Tice
Grand Influencer Award	Wisconsin – Victoria Mercedes Ng
Best Evening Wear	New Jersey – Jacqueline Pineda
Best in Interview	Delaware – Allison LaForce
Best in Swimsuit	Indiana – Victoria Oluwakotanmi
Best in Street Wear	Nevada – Shelbi Byrnes
Best State Costume	Indiana – Victoria Oluwakotanmi
Awards for state directors
Best state director	Miss Grand Texas – Leslie Galareta & Oscar Rivera; Miss Grand New Jersey – Rommel Gopez; Miss Grand D.C., Maryland, & Virginia – Yelena Scheidler

== Contestants ==
Initially, 32 contestants representing 32 of the 51 state-level jurisdictions were confirmed to participate. However, Julia Johnston of Colorado, Nikki Raheja of Connecticut and Messiah Banks of Pennsylvania later withdrew, reducing the field to 29 contestants.

State	Contestant
Alabama	Paula Uchenna Ezendu
Arizona	Nishka Dhawan
California	Keshia Lee
Colorado	Julia Johnston (withdrew)
Connecticut	Nikki Raheja (withdrew)
Delaware	Allison LaForce
District of Columbia	Lina Xie
Florida	Luisa Ganatios
Georgia	Yetunde Babalola
Hawaii	Alicia Ontiveros
Illinois	Whitney Victoria Powell
Indiana	Victoria Oluwakotanmi
Louisiana	Francie Millan
Maryland	Tagan Vaz-Barros
Massachusetts	Mekyla Li Bedwell
Michigan	Yadira Muñoz
Nevada	Shelbi Byrnes
New Jersey	Jacqueline Pineda
New Mexico	Alma Gonzalez
New York	Arianna Nicolette Tice
North Carolina	Yukina Nguyen
Ohio	Francis Malpica
Oregon	Sofia Mcdaniel
Pennsylvania	Messiah Banks (withdrew)
Rhode Island	Maryah Watkins
South Carolina	Mikayla Mosley
Tennessee	Amanda Bell
Texas	Natalie Gonzalez
Utah	Bianca Yoelix Perez-Vazquez
Virginia	Dasha Barth
West Virginia	Phantasia Mason
Wisconsin	Victoria Mercedes Ng
