= Esonica Veira =

US Virgin Islander model and beauty queen (born 1990)

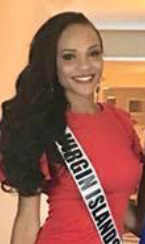
- 2017
- Born: June 8, 1990 (age 36); Saint Thomas, U.S. Virgin Islands
- Education: Alabama State University
- Height: 1.73 m (5 ft 8 in) 86 cm (33.9 in); Waist: 61 cm (24.0 in); Hips: 91 cm (35.8 in)
- Beauty pageant titleholder
- Title: Miss Universe US Virgin Islands 2017; Miss Earth U.S. Virgin Islands 2014; Miss World U.S. Virgin Islands 2011
- Hair color: Brown
- Eye color: Brown
- Major competitions: Miss World 2011 (Top 15); Miss Supranational 2013 (4th Runner Up); Miss Earth 2014 (Unplaced); Miss Universe 2017 (Unplaced)

Esonica Veira (born June 8, 1990) is a US Virgin Islander model and beauty queen who won the title of Miss Universe US Virgin Islands 2017 and represented the US Virgin Islands at the Miss Universe 2017 pageant on November 26, 2017 in Las Vegas. Esonica was the territory's representative for Miss Earth 2014. Previously, Esonica represented her country in the Miss World 2011 pageant held in London, UK. After her Miss World participation, she was once again selected to compete in Miss Supranational 2013 in Minsk, Belarus.

Along with her stints in pageantry, Esonica is a makeup artist and model coach, providing support to young women who aspire to possess poise, finesse, and beauty.

== Biography ==
=== Early life and career beginnings ===
Esonica has been a model in St. Thomas since the age of 9, beginning with the Roses and Champagne Agency. She has participated in many other fashion events, including the Face of Shabeau in Barbados, winning the cover model spot, and the Caribbean Fashion Week Catwalk, held annually in the Virgin Islands.

Her breakthrough came in 2007 when she joined America's Next Top Model. She made the first cut during the casting call auditions in Montgomery, Alabama.

She was also a finalist in the singing competition V.I. Idol in 2008.

== Pageantry ==
Esonica's successes on the local and international level includes winning the titles of Ms. Hal Jackson's Virgin Islands Talented Teen 2005, Ms. Hal Jackson's International Talented Teen 2005, Ms. America's Outstanding Teen Talent Winner 2006, and Virgin Islands Carnival Queen 2007.

Esonica was selected as one of "The 50 Most Beautiful Women in the World” by a panel of judges for Global Beauties. A panel of international judges made their selection based on the top international pageants held worldwide in 2011.

=== Miss World 2011 ===
By achieving the first runner up, Esonica became the country's representative for the 2011 edition of Miss World. She finished as part of the Top 15 semifinalists.

During the fast track events, Esonica placed as part of the Top 36 for Beach Beauty round, second place for the talent round, and part of the Top 20 for the Beauty with Purpose segment.

The pageant was won by Ivian Sarcos of Venezuela.

=== Miss Supranational 2013 ===
In May, 2013, Esonica was crowned Miss US Paradise Supranational, and traveled to Minsk, Belarus, where she represented the US Virgin Islands in the Miss Supranational Pageant.

Esonica was awarded second runner Up in the Talent Finals, and placed fourth Runner Up in the Grand Finale, making her the first representative from the US Virgin Islands to place in the Top 5 of an International Pageant.

The pageant was won by Mutya Johanna Datul of the Philippines.

=== Miss Earth 2014 ===
Esonica flew to the Philippines in November 2014 to compete with almost 100 other candidates to be Alyz Henrich's successor as Miss Earth. She did not place in the competition but was awarded as Best Teacher and Best in Talent.

=== Miss Universe 2017 ===
Veira represented the U.S. Virgin Islands at Miss Universe 2017 in Las Vegas, Nevada, but did not place. She did however place in the Top 20 in the National Costume competition.

== Reality Television ==
Esonica appeared on Season 2 of Temptation Island (TV series), an American reality television program broadcast on USA Network in which Esonica, along with her boyfriend, was one of several couples who agreed to live with a group of singles of the opposite sex, in order to test the strength of her relationship.

Awards and achievements
Preceded by Shakyma Roshundia Mercado	Miss Virgin Islands' Outstanding Teen; 2006	Succeeded by Reisha Alyssa Corneiro
Preceded by Vanessa Donastorg	Miss Earth U.S. Virgin Islands; 2014	Succeeded by Incumbent
Preceded by Carolyn Carter	Miss US Paradise World; 2011	Succeeded by Taiesa Lashley
Preceded by Carolyn Carter	Miss US Virgin Islands; 2017	Succeeded by Aniska Tonge
