= Miss Grand United States 2024 =

7th Miss Grand United States pageant

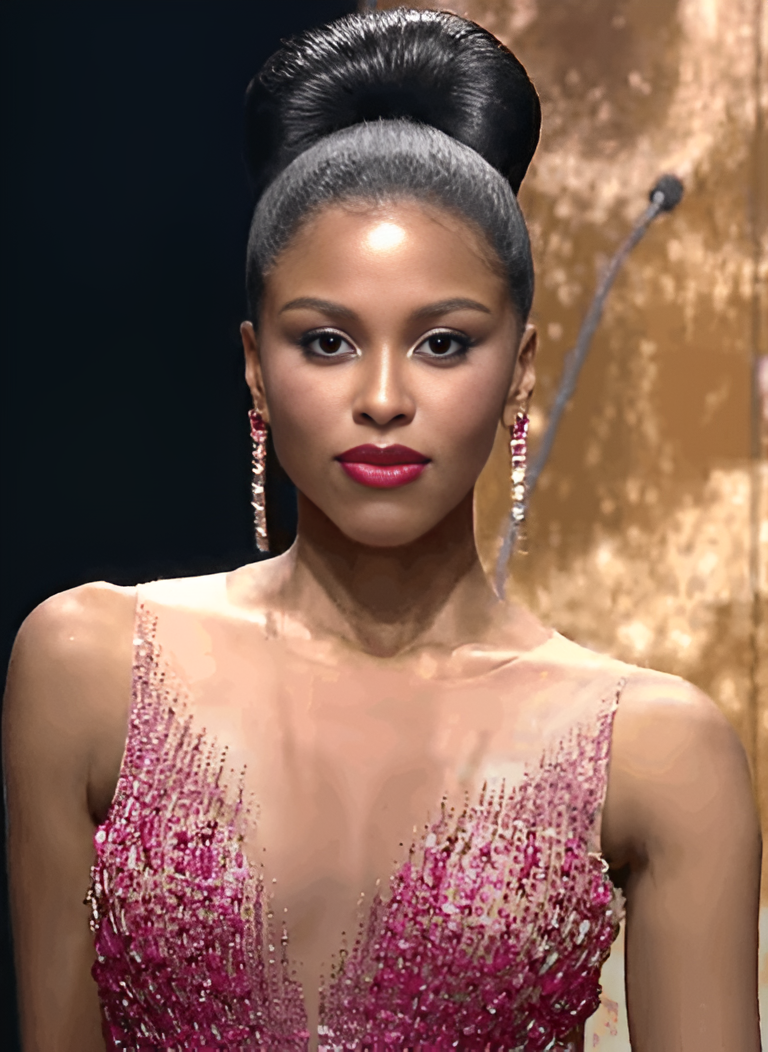
- Cora Griffen, the winner of the contest
- Date: August 12, 2024
- Venue: Club M2, Miami, Florida, United States
- Entrants: 19
- Placements: 12
- Withdrawals: District of Columbia; Great Lakes; Hawaii; Mid-Atlantic; Maryland; Michigan; New England; Northeast; Ohio; Pennsylvania; Tri-State; West Coast
- Returns: Arizona; Massachusetts; Minnesota; New Mexico; Rhode Island; South Carolina; Virginia
- Winner: Cora Griffen (Georgia)
- Congeniality: Hanin Al Qoreishy (Nevada)
- Photogenic: Andrea Valentina (Florida)

External videos
- Miss Grand United States 2024 Finals
- 2024 Miss Grand USA Finals by Iron Tiara LLC

Miss Grand United States 2024 was the 7th edition of the Miss Grand USA pageant, held on August 12, 2024, in Miami, Florida, at the Club M2. Contestants from 19 states of the United States competed for the title.

At the end of the event, Miss Grand United States 2023 Sthephanie Miranda crowned Cora Griffen of Georgia as her successor. Griffen later represented the country at the international stage, Miss Grand International 2024, held in Bangkok, Thailand, on October 25, 2024 but was unplaced.

This year's edition was also the first Miss Grand United States organized by Protagonist Live LLC with former 2nd runner-up Miss Grand United States 2023, Rachel Slawson, as the pageant director under Iron Tiara LLC.

== Background ==
=== Date and venue ===
After obtaining the Miss Grand USA pageant license in early 2024, the organizer announced on the official social platforms that the 2024 Miss Grand United States national competition has been set for Miami, Florida, from August 9–12, with the swimwear competition on August 11.

=== Selection of contestants ===
The national finalists for Miss Grand United States 2024 were determined by the state licensees or the national organizer. In Florida, a local competition named "Miss Grand Treasure Coast" was organized as the preliminary to the state pageant, Miss Grand Florida.

Only four states organized their state-level pageants to elect representatives for this year's edition, as detailed below.

Pageant	Edition	Date	Final venue	Entrants	Ref.
Miss Grand Texas	4th	Jan 12, 2024	Sheraton Brookhollow Hotel, Houston	8	
Miss Grand New Jersey	1st	Jan 14, 2024	White Eagle Hall, Jersey City	7	
Miss Grand Florida	5th	Jun 2, 2024	Teatro 8, Miami	9	
Miss Grand California	2nd	Jun 30, 2024	Skiptown Playhouse, Los Angeles	2	

== Results ==
Miss Grand USA 2024 competition results by state
Color key:
Winner	1st RU	2nd RU
3rd RU	4th RU	Top 8
Top 12	Unplaced	Withdrew
No representative		RU = Runner-up

Placement	Contestant
Miss Grand USA 2024	Georgia – Cora Griffen
1st runner-up	New Jersey – Tiajah Elliott
2nd runner-up	Illinois – Victoria Oluwakotanmi
3rd runner-up	Florida – Andrea Valentina
4th runner-up	Arizona – Giselle Burgos
Top 8	California – Me-Kayla Brittany; New York – Ariel Jingjing Cao; Texas – Karina Ramirez
Top 12	Colorado – Liza Degtiarova; Minnesota – Nkechi Okorie; Nevada – Hanin Al Qoreishy; New Mexico – Francely Lopez
Special awards
Miss Photogenic	Florida – Andrea Valentina
Miss Congeniality	Nevada – Hanin Al Qoreishy
Grand Voice Award	New Jersey – Tiajah Elliott
Best in Social Media	Illinois – Victoria Oluwakotanmi
Best in Swimsuit	Massachusetts – Joyce Sanchez
Top Model Award	New Jersey – Tiajah Elliott
Dreame Hair Award	California – Me-Kayla Brittany

== Contestants ==
Initially, twenty contestants were confirmed to participate but Sara Zaimi of Connecticut later withdrew.

State	Contestant	Age	Hometown
Arizona	Giselle Burgos	—	—
California	Me-Kayla Brittany	—	Ridgecrest
Colorado	Liza Degtiarova	—	Denver
Connecticut	Sara Zaimi (withdrew)	—	—
Florida	Andrea Valentina	28	Miami
Georgia	Cora Griffen	28	Columbus
Illinois	Victoria Oluwakotanmi	23	Chicago
Louisiana	Cassandra Negrete	18	Baton Rouge
Massachusetts	Joyce Sanchez	—	Boston
Minnesota	Nkechi Okorie	—	—
Missouri	Rachel Ringgenberg	28	St. Louis
Nevada	Hanin Al Qoreishy	—	Las Vegas
New Jersey	Tiajah Elliott	22	Linden
New Mexico	Francely Lopez	28	Albuquerque
New York	Ariel Jingjing Cao	—	—
Rhode Island	Christella Merveille Ilunga	—	Providence
South Carolina	Jakiyra Hambright	—	—
Texas	Karina Ramirez	28	Houston
Virginia	Amella Montiel–Goodman	—	Orlando
Washington	Gillian Arroyo	—	Seattle
