= Carolyn Carter =

Virgin Islander actress and model (born 1990)

- Born: Carolyn Whitney Carter; January 12, 1990 (age 36); New Orleans, Louisiana, U.S.
- Height: 1.70 m (5 ft 7 in)
- Beauty pageant titleholder
- Title: Miss World US Virgin Islands 2010; Miss US Virgin Islands 2016
- Hair color: Brown
- Eye color: Brown
- Major competitions: Miss World 2010 (unplaced); Miss Supranational 2011 (unplaced); Miss Earth 2012 (unplaced); Miss Universe 2016 (unplaced)

Carolyn Whitney Carter (born January 12, 1990) is a Virgin Islander actress, model and beauty pageant titleholder who won Miss US Virgin Islands 2016. She represented the U.S. Virgin Islands at the Miss Universe 2016.. On July 26, 2023, the U.S. Securities and Exchange Commission charged Carolyn Carter with insider trading after she allegedly used insider information from her former boyfriend, 86 year old billionaire Joe Lewis. Lewis and Carter were in a romantic relationship from 2013-2020.

== Personal life ==
Carter was born in New Orleans and grew up in St Croix. She graduated from AZ Academy in St. Croix and swam competitively for the St. Croix Dolphins for 11 years and the US Virgin Islands National Swim Team. She attended Emory University in Atlanta, Georgia, where she studied art and art history.

Carter moved in with Tottenham Hotspur owner Joe Lewis in 2015 or 2016 and they continued a romantic relationship until 2020. He frequently gave her gifts, including cash transfers of approximately $100,000 per year.

In September 2019, while Carter was dating Joe Lewis, she received insider information about Mirati Therapeutics, a publicly traded oncology company in which Lewis invests. Carter bought 16,400 shares of the company, using almost all the funds in her brokerage account. The day after Mirati announced encouraging trial results, its stock closed up more than 16%, and Carter sold all her stock.

== Pageantry ==
=== Miss World US Virgin Islands 2010 ===
Carter was crowned Miss World U.S. Virgin Islands 2010 and then competed at Miss World 2010 in China.

=== Miss World 2010 ===
Carter represented the island at Miss World 2010 in China but did not placed.

=== Miss Supranational 2011 ===
Carter also represented the island at Miss Supranational 2011 in Poland but did not place.

=== Miss Earth 2012 ===
Carter competed at Miss Earth 2012 on November 24, 2012.

=== Miss US Virgin Islands 2016 ===
Carter was crowned Miss US Virgin Islands Universe on May 2, 2016, in St. Thomas, US Virgin Islands.

=== Miss Universe 2016 ===
Carter represented the island in Miss Universe 2016 but did not place.

Awards and achievements
| Preceded by Alexandrya Evans | Miss US Virgin Islands; 2016 | Succeeded by Esonica Veira |
