= Petra Cabrera (model) =

Virgin Islander model and beauty pageant titleholder

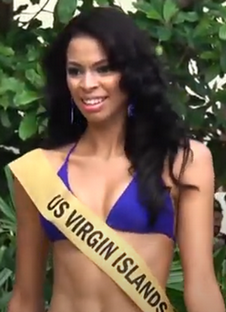
- Cabrera in 2015
- Born: Dominican Republic
- Height: 1.78 m (5 ft 10 in)
- Beauty pageant titleholder
- Title: Miss U.S. Paradise World 2013
- Major competitions: Miss World 2013 (Top 32); Miss Grand International 2015 (Unplaced)

Petra Cabrera-Badia is a Virgin Islander model and beauty pageant titleholder who represented her country in the Miss World 2013 pageant held in Bali, Indonesia.

== Biography ==
=== Early life and career beginnings ===
Petra was born in Dominican Republic but resided in U.S. Virgin Islands for several years now. She is working in a medical office support role, she has ambitions of studying Business Administration with a view to starting her own business.

=== Miss World 2013 ===
Miss World 2013, the 63rd edition of the Miss World pageant was held on September 28, 2013 at Bali Nusa Dua Convention Center in Bali, Indonesia. 127 contestants from all over the world competed, making the biggest turnout in the pageant's history.

When she won in the national competition, Petra got the right to represent U.S Virgin Islands in Miss World. She flew to Indonesia to take part in the said pageant where she was unplaced. During the "Beach Fashion" round in the preliminaries, Petra was able to be part of the Top 32 but she lost to the Brazil's representative, Sancler Frantz.

The 2013 edition was won by Megan Young of the Philippines.

=== Miss Grand International 2015 ===
Petra Cabrera was appointed as Miss Grand United States Virgin Islands 2015 by the Miss U.S. Paradise organization to compete at the Miss Grand International 2015 pageant in Thailand, but she was unplaced.

Preceded by Taiesa Lashley	Miss US Virgin Islands; 2013	Succeeded by Aniska Tonge
