= Miss Grand Ireland =

Irish beauty pageant title

- Formation: 2017
- Type: Beauty pageant
- Headquarters: Dublin
- Location: Ireland
- Members: Miss Grand International
- Official language: English
- Parent organization: Miss International UK (2017); Ireland Faces (2019 – 2022)

Miss Grand Ireland is a national beauty pageant title awarded to Irish representatives chosen to compete at the Miss Grand International pageant. The title was first awarded in 2013 to the runner-up of Britain's Big Brother series 15, Ashleigh Coyle, after she competed at the 2017 Miss International United Kingdom; however, Coyle did not partake in the international tournament in Vietnam.

In 2017, the license of Miss Grand Ireland belonged to the Culcheth-based event planner, Pageant Girl UK, which is also the organizer of the Miss International United Kingdom contest. After the license was not renewed in 2018, it was purchased by a Dublin beauty pageant coordinator group led by Manuel Munares the following year.

Since the title of Miss Grand Ireland was introduced in 2017, no Miss Grand National was held to select the titleholders; all of them were either determined through another pageant or directly hand-picked by national licensees in that particular year.

== History ==
Initially, Ireland was expected to debut in Miss Grand International in 2017, when a Big Brother star from Derry, Ashleigh Coyle, was assigned to represent Ireland in the Miss Grand International 2017 in Vietnam. Ashleigh obtained the title after she participated in the Miss International United Kingdom 2017 pageant where she was placed among the top 16 finalists. She withdrew for undisclosed reasons.

Ireland made an actual debutant in 2019 when a Venezuelan Irish, Manuel Munares, purchased the license and assigned a Thai Irish beauty queen who previously competed at Miss Grand Thailand 2019, Sudawan Kumdee, as the replacement of the original representative Hollie Hersey, to join the international contest in Venezuela, and she was placed among the top 20 finalists, which is considered the only and highest placement, as of 2023, the Irish delegates obtained in the Miss Grand International. The following Irish representatives for Miss Grand International were all also appointed; no Miss Grand National was organized to determine the titleholders.

Gallery

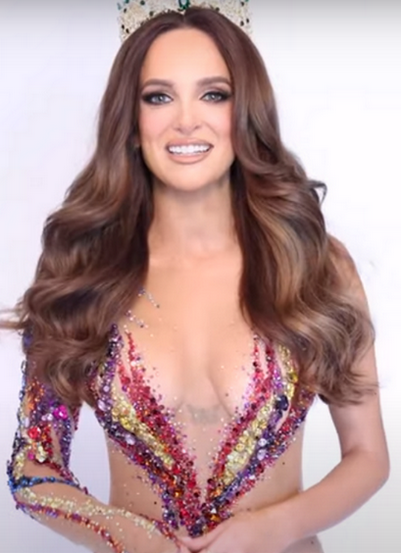
Miss Grand Ireland 2023
Rachel Slawson

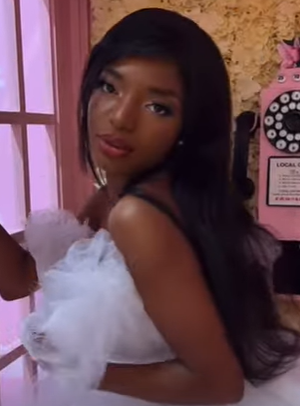
Miss Grand Ireland 2022
Peace Olaniyi

== International competition ==
The following is a list of Irish representatives at the Miss Grand International contest.

Year	Representative	Original national title	Competition performance		National director
Year	Representative	Original national title	Placement	Other awards	National director
2017	Ashleigh Coyle	Top 16 Miss International United Kingdom 2017	Unable to compete		Holly Pirrie
2019	Hollie Hersey	Appointed	Resigned		Manuel Munares
2019	Sudawan Kumdee	Miss Grand Thailand 2019 finalist	Top 20	—N/a	Manuel Munares
2020	Tirna Slevín	Appointed	Unplaced	—N/a	Manuel Munares
2022	Peace Olaniyi	Appointed	Unplaced	—N/a	Manuel Munares
2023	Rachel Slawson	2nd runner-up Miss Grand United States 2023	Unplaced	—N/a	Self-dominated
2024	No representatives				
