= Shriya Boppana =

Beauty pageant titleholder and activist

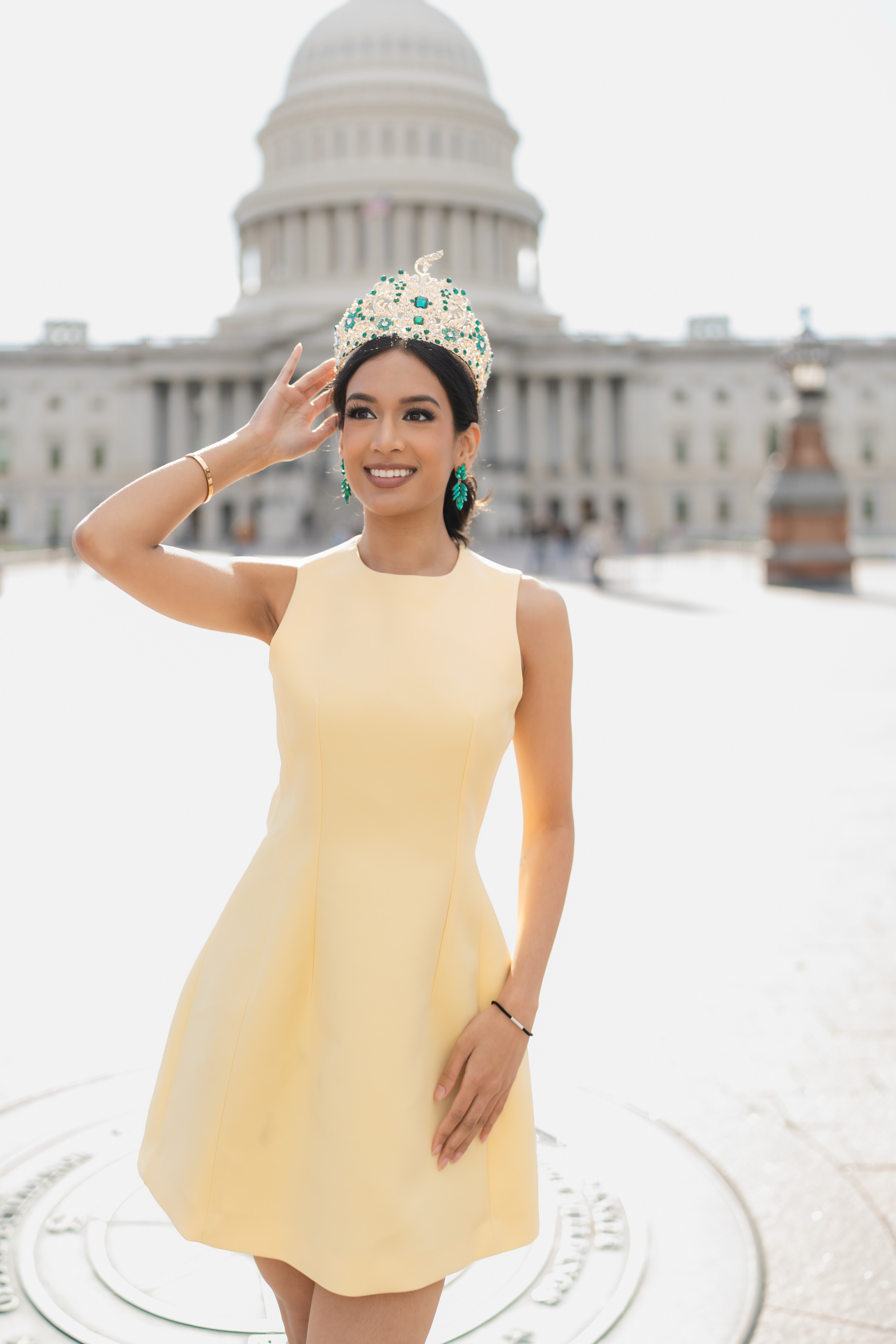
- Shriya Boppana in 2025
- Born: January 8, 1999 (age 27); Hyderabad, Andhra Pradesh, India (present-day Telangana, India)
- Education: Duke University; Carnegie Mellon University
- Beauty pageant titleholder
- Title: Miss Grand India USA 2025; Miss Grand United States Virgin Islands 2024; Miss India America 2020
- Major competitions: Miss Grand India USA 2025 (Winner); Miss Grand United States Virgin Islands 2024 (Winner; Assumed); Miss Earth DC 2022 (1st Runner-Up); Miss India America (Winner); Miss India DC (1st Runner-Up)
- Website: shriyaboppana.com

Shriya Boppana (born January 8, 1999) is an Indian-American beauty pageant titleholder, award-winning activist, and on-air personality who was crowned as the winner of Miss India America 2020, Miss Grand US Virgin Islands 2024, and Miss Grand India USA 2025. Boppana is a broadcast journalist formerly at WDCA (locally known as "FOX 5 Plus") in Washington, D.C. and a consulting analyst at Accenture.

== Early life ==
Boppana was born in Hyderabad, Telangana to a Telugu family. Her great-grandparents were freedom fighters. Lingaya Gadde, who went to jail multiple times while taking part in the 1923 Civil Disobedience, Flag Satyagraha, and Quit India Movement. Boppana's father served as a marine engineer in the United States Marine Corps.

She was raised in Herndon, Virginia. She graduated from Herndon High School in 2017, and later received a bachelor's degree in Business Administration from Carnegie Mellon University in 2021. In May 2026, she graduated from Duke University's Fuqua School of Business with her Master of Business Administration as a Forte Foundation Fellow and a Fuqua Impact Scholar.

== Pageantry ==
In September 2020, Boppana placed 1st Runner Up at Miss India DC 2020 and was later awarded Miss India America 2020 with a high-point interview award for perfect scores from all judges.

In August 2022, Boppana placed 1st Runner Up at Miss Earth DC 2022 with a high-point interview award for perfect scores from all judges.

On 25 March 2024, Boppana placed 1st Runner Up at Miss Grand US Virgin Islands 2024, preliminary to Miss Grand International, also winning Miss Grand Smile, Miss Grand Congeniality 2nd Runner Up, and highest interview score.

In May 2024, Boppana declined the title of Miss Cosmo US Virgin Islands 2024 to pursue her MBA at Duke University's Fuqua School of Business.

In April 2025, Boppana was announced as the winner of Miss Grand India USA 2025.

== Advocacy ==
In 2021, Boppana founded Becoming A Voice, a resource creation center for gender and sex crime advocacy content. The organization holds sexual health education workshops in India and Nepal and provides resources and support to survivors of sex trafficking and sexual assault.

In April 2021, Boppana became a student speaker for TedXCMU and presented a TedX talk delving into media's role in perpetuating gender stereotypes and imbalance.

On 14 May 2021, Boppana was a featured student speaker thanking educators nationwide at Her Campus' 2021 graduation ceremony, Cheer to the Future.

In June 2021, Boppana was invited to host a panel on gender-based violence in media at the United Nations Foundation's Girl Up 2021 Leadership Summit.

Boppana served as a Global Youth Ambassador for She's The First in 2021.

As of October 2021, Boppana joined Indian child sexual assault prevention organization, Bachpan Save the Innocence, on the facilitation and design team. With the organization, Boppana has educated 3,200 individuals at approximately 60 orphanages, schools and colleges with 10 different programs detailing safe and unsafe touch, consent and puberty, digital safety, cybercrime, sexual abuse and trafficking as of February 2, 2022.

On December 5, 2023, Boppana made the Forbes 30 Under 30 list for the inaugural Austin edition as an activist and TV personality.

In October 2024, Boppana hosted a panel on girls' education rights at the United Nations Foundation's Girl Up 2024 Global Leadership Summit alongside Diana award winner, Muzhda Akbari, and STEM activist, Elisa Torres Durney.

On March 11, 2025, Carnegie Mellon University released its annual Tartans on the Rise list which recognized Boppana as an Anti-sex Trafficking Activist highlighting her as "fighting for Gender and Sexual Justice Around the World."

== On-Air personality ==
'Becoming A Voice with Shriya Boppana' produced by Global Television Networks first aired on the show Capital Forum on WDCA (locally known as "FOX 5 Plus") in 2021.

August 9, 2022, Boppana appears in The Wall Street Journal's 'Future View' Snapchat series episode on the pros and cons of the death penalty.

On 3 August 2021, Boppana was featured in an episode of WJLA (locally known as "ABC 7 News") 'Future Leaders of America.'

On 5 November 2024, Boppana made her TV9 debut covering the 2024 United States Presidential Election on TV9 Telugu in India and the TV9 USA YouTube Channel.
