= Blair Griffith =

American model and beauty pageant titleholde

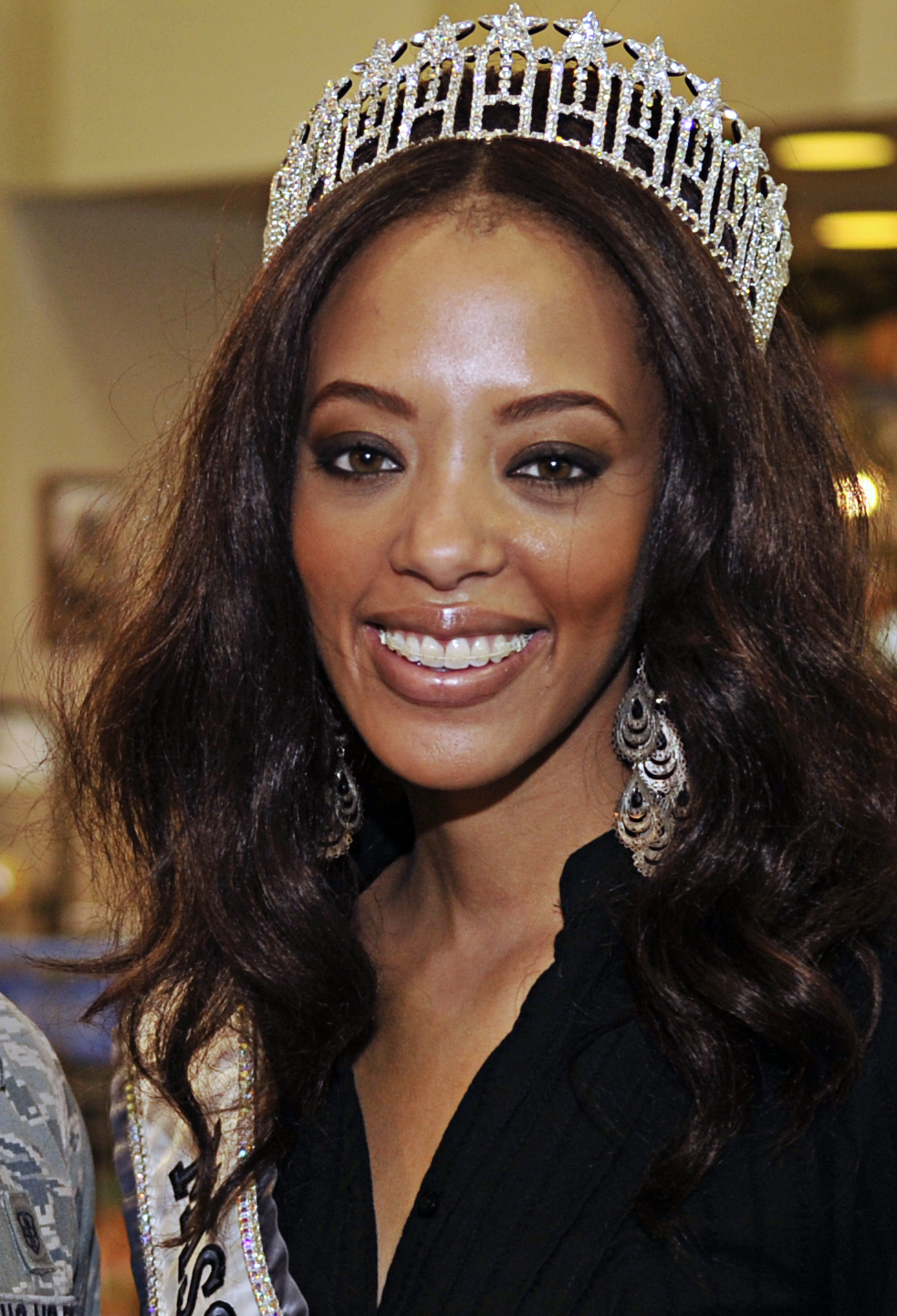
- Griffith in 2011
- Born: Blair Adair Griffith; January 20, 1988 (age 38); Denver, Colorado, U.S.
- Beauty pageant titleholder
- Major competitions: Miss Teen USA 2006 (Unplaced); Miss Colorado USA 2011 (Winner); Miss USA 2011 (Unplaced); Miss Grand International 2013 (Top 20)

Blair Adair Griffith (born January 20, 1988, in Denver, Colorado) is an American model and beauty pageant titleholder who won Miss Colorado USA 2011 and represented Colorado in Miss USA 2011. Griffith reached national and international headlines when she revealed she and her mother were homeless and that Griffith was out of a job after winning the title in November 2010.

== Pageantry ==
Griffith has earlier won the Miss Congeniality part of Miss Teen USA 2006 without placing in the Top 15. According to Griffith, her mother Bonita's sudden heart attack, and major surgery led to the family's economic situation and bankruptcy. Griffith's mother also lost her insurance when her insurer declared that the heart attack was the result of a pre-existing condition.

That meant that she had to pay her medical expenses, including $800 a month for medications, on her own. In early April fashion designer Mac Duggal stated he had agreed to design all the gowns that Griffith will need to be in the pageant free of charge. In 2013, she represented USA at the first edition of Miss Grand International 2013 in Bangkok, Thailand where she placed in the Top 20.
