= Silver State (disambiguation) =

Silver State is a nickname for Nevada, a U.S. state.

Silver State may also refer to:

== Places ==
- Yinzhou District, Tieling (simplified Chinese: 银州区; traditional Chinese: 銀州區; lit. 'Silver State'), a district of Tieling, Liaoning province, China

== Brands and enterprises ==
- Silver State Bank, a former commercial bank in Nevada
- Silver State Flour Mill, built in 1864 in Nevada
- Silver State Helicopters, a former helicopter flight training, sight seeing tours and charter air operator based in Nevada

== Sports ==
- Silver State Classic Challenge, a motor race on the State Route 318 in Nevada
- Silver State Diamond Challenge, a minor league baseball rivalry between the Las Vegas 51s and the Reno Aces, in Nevada
- Silver State Legacy, a team of the Women's Football Alliance based in Nevada

== Other uses ==
- All Net Resort and Arena, in Nevada, which was to have been the Silver State Arena
- Matthew Ryan vs. The Silver State a, 2008 album by Matthew Ryan
- Silver State North Solar Project, in Nevada
- Silver State South Solar Project, in Nevada
- USS Zeilin (APA-3), a ship launched in 1921 as Silver State
