= Silver State Diamond Challenge =

- Sport: Baseball
- Teams: Las Vegas Aviators; Reno Aces
- First meeting: June 15, 2009; Aces Ballpark
- Latest meeting: September 14, 2021; Las Vegas Ballpark
- Next meeting: April 5, 2022; Las Vegas Ballpark

Statistics
- Largest victory: 20–3, Reno (May 31, 2018)
- Current win streak: Reno: 3

The Silver State Diamond Challenge is a Minor League Baseball rivalry between Nevada's two Triple-A baseball teams, the Las Vegas Aviators and the Reno Aces of the Pacific Coast League (PCL). The rivalry began in 2009 when the Aces joined the PCL as members of the Pacific Conference Southern Division along with the Aviators, who were known as the Las Vegas 51s at the time.

The winner of the regular season series between Las Vegas and Reno receives the Silver Plate Trophy, a silver replica of a home plate with an image of the state of Nevada and markings of the locations of Las Vegas and Reno on the left, while the opposite side lists the winner of the series for each year.

In the event of a tie series, the defending champion from the previous season retains the trophy. The only exception to this rule was in the first season, which ended in a tie. To determine the inaugural champion, the mayors of each city met to draw cards to break the tie. A card draw occurred at Aces Ballpark in downtown Reno with Las Vegas mayor Oscar Goodman drawing a 7, while Reno mayor Bob Cashell drew a 6, giving the 51s the Silver Plate Trophy for 2009.

== All-time series results ==
Season	Series winner	Las Vegas wins	Reno wins	Notes	Ref
2009	51s	8	8	Series tied; champion decided by card draw	
2010	Aces	5	11	—	
2011	Aces	8	8	Series tied; Aces retain trophy	
2012	Aces	8	8	Series tied; Aces retain trophy	
2013	51s	13	3	—	
2014	51s	8	8	Series tied; 51s retain trophy	
2015	51s	11	5	—	
2016	Aces	7	9	—	
2017	Aces	4	12	—	
2018	51s	10	6	—	
2019	Aviators	11	5	First season as Las Vegas Aviators	
2020	season cancelled due to COVID-19 pandemic				
2021	Aces	10	15		
2022	TBD				
Overall	Tied, 6–6	103	98	—	—

=== 2009 ===
Date	Winning team	Score	Location
June 15	Reno	5–3	Reno
June 16	Reno	4–2	Reno
June 17	Las Vegas	5–0	Reno
July 1	Las Vegas	12–6	Las Vegas
July 2	Las Vegas	2–0	Las Vegas
July 3	Reno	3–1	Las Vegas
July 8	Las Vegas	12–9 (10)	Reno
July 9	Las Vegas	5–4 (10)	Reno
July 10	Reno	10–9	Reno
July 11	Reno	9–5	Reno
July 12	Las Vegas	10–5	Reno
August 26	Reno	6–4	Las Vegas
August 27	Las Vegas	1–0	Las Vegas
August 28	Reno	6–0	Las Vegas
August 29	Reno	14–6	Las Vegas
August 30	Las Vegas	9–0	Las Vegas

=== 2010 ===
Date	Winning team	Score	Location
May 3	Reno	8–7	Reno
May 4	Reno	6–3	Reno
May 5	Las Vegas	13–7	Reno
May 6	Reno	12–2	Reno
July 1	Reno	9–2	Las Vegas
July 2	Las Vegas	9–5	Las Vegas
July 3	Reno	11–9	Las Vegas
July 27	Las Vegas	7–5	Reno
July 28	Reno	8–0	Reno
July 29	Reno	11–3	Reno
July 30	Las Vegas	12–9	Reno
August 25	Reno	5–1	Las Vegas
August 26	Reno	4–2	Las Vegas
August 27	Reno	10–5	Las Vegas
August 28	Reno	12–10	Las Vegas
August 29	Las Vegas	12–8	Las Vegas

=== 2011 ===
Date	Winning team	Score	Location
May 2	Reno	12–8	Las Vegas
May 3	Las Vegas	7–6	Las Vegas
May 4	Las Vegas	4–3	Las Vegas
May 5	Las Vegas	5–3	Las Vegas
June 17	Las Vegas	6–4	Las Vegas
June 18	Las Vegas	5–4	Las Vegas
June 19	Reno	12–9	Las Vegas
June 20	Reno	8–4	Las Vegas
June 21	Reno	13–6	Reno
June 22	Las Vegas	16–8	Reno
June 23	Reno	8–7	Reno
June 24	Reno	16–7	Reno
July 26	Reno	10–5	Reno
July 27	Las Vegas	7–3	Reno
July 28	Reno	8–6	Reno
July 29	Las Vegas	11–7	Reno
