= Sthephanie Miranda =

Puerto Rican beauty pageant titleholder (born 1993)

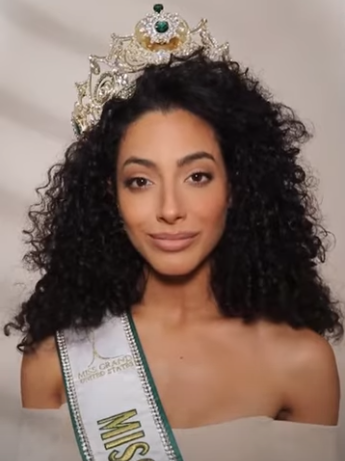
- Sthephanie Miranda in 2023
- Born: Sthephanie Marie Miranda Morales; November 9, 1993 (age 32); San Juan, Puerto Rico
- Education: Youngstown State University (BA)
- Height: 1.68 m (5 ft 6 in)
- Beauty pageant titleholder
- Title: Miss Ohio USA 2020; Miss Grand USA 2023
- Major competitions: Miss Latinoamérica 2018 (Winner); Miss Ohio USA 2020 (Winner); Miss USA 2020 (Top 16); Miss Universe Puerto Rico 2021 (Top 6); Nuestra Belleza Puerto Rico 2023 (1st runner-up); Miss Grand United States 2023 (Winner); Miss Grand International 2023 (3rd runner-up)

Sthephanie Marie Miranda Morales (born November 9, 1993) is a Puerto Rican beauty pageant titleholder. She was Miss Ohio USA 2020, Top 16 Miss USA 2020, Top 5 Miss Universe Puerto Rico 2021 and first runner-up of Nuestra Belleza Puerto Rico 2023. Miranda represented the United States at Miss Grand International 2023 held in Vietnam in October 25, 2023, and was named 3rd Runner-Up to Luciana Fuster of Peru.

== Early life and education ==
Miranda was born in San Juan, Puerto Rico. She moved to Campbell, Ohio, at the age of five, and graduated in communications, journalism, and theatre from Youngstown State University.

== Pageantry ==
She was the winner of Miss Ohio USA 2020 and participated in the Miss USA 2020 competition. She advanced to the top 16 in the final round. Later in 2023, Miranda represented the Great Lakes at the Miss Grand United States competition held August, 2023 in Chicago, Illinois, and became Miss Grand United States 2023. She represented the United States in the Miss Grand International 2023 pageant in Vietnam where she was crowned the 3rd runner-up.

Awards and achievements
Preceded by (Venezuela) Luiseth Materán	Miss Grand International 3rd Runner-Up; 2023	Succeeded by (France) Safiétou Kabengele (Resigned) (Spain) Susana Medina (Assumed)
Preceded by Emily DeMure	Miss Grand United States; 2023	Succeeded by Cora Griffen
Preceded by Raixa Nati González	Miss Trujillo Alto Universe; 2023	Succeeded by Juanita Polanco Irizarry
Preceded by Alice Magoto	Miss Ohio USA; 2020	Succeeded by Nicole Wess
Preceded by (Venezuela) Lisandra Chirinos	Miss Latinoamerica; 2018	Succeeded by (Uruguay) Marisol Acosta
