= Reef Bay, U.S. Virgin Islands =

Coordinates: 18°19′46″N 64°44′16″W

Reef Bay is a neighborhood and bay on the island of Saint John in the United States Virgin Islands. Most of this area is part of Virgin Islands National Park. The inhabited portion is along the west side of Reef Bay, near Fish Bay. The Reef Bay Sugar Factory ruins are located in the center of Reef Bay, in an area known as Genti Bay. The nearly 3 mile long Reef Bay Trail is a National Park Service maintained hiking trail that runs through the area from Centerline Road to Genti Bay.
