= Barrett, U.S. Virgin Islands =

Coordinates: 18°21′55″N 64°56′46″W

Barrett is a settlement on the island of Saint Thomas in the United States Virgin Islands.
