= Miss Grand USA =

Beauty contest

Miss Grand United States of America
- Formation: May 28, 2016; 10 years ago
- Founder: Chantel Martínez
- Type: Beauty pageant
- Headquarters: Chicago
- Location: United States
- Members: Miss Grand International
- Official language: English
- National directors: Candace Thomas; Sthephanie Miranda (2026–present)
- Parent organization: Crown Legacy LLC (2024–2026)
- Website: officialmissgrandusa.com

Miss Grand USA, also referred to as Miss Grand United States of America, is an annual female beauty pageant in the United States, founded in 2016 by a Dominican-American businessperson, Chantel Martínez, aiming to select the country representative for Miss Grand International, which is an annual international beauty pageant promoting World Peace and against all kinds of conflicts.

The Miss Grand USA organization has been franchising the state competitions to individual organizers since 2016, which in some cases are responsible for more than one state. Each U.S. state must choose a candidate who competes at the national Miss Grand USA pageant, however, delegates may be appointed state or regional titles if a state pageant is not offered in their area.

The United States holds a record of 6 placements at Miss Grand International, the highest position was first place, won in 2020 by Abena Appiah of New York, followed by the third and fourth runners-up by Sthephanie Miranda and Michelle León in 2023 and 2016, respectively.

== History ==
The United States has participated in Miss Grand International since the pageant's inception in 2013. Under the management of Earth Pageant Productions from 2013 to 2015, the first two representatives were appointed to compete internationally without a national pageant for Miss Grand, while the third earned the title through the Miss Earth United States 2015. During this period, two representatives, Blair Griffith and Lauren Petersen, placed among the top 20 finalists in 2013 and 2015, respectively.

After Chantel Martínez, a New York-based Dominican-American fashion model, acquired the franchise in 2016, she organized the inaugural Miss Grand USA pageant to select the country's representative for the international competition. The event was held at Leonard Nimoy Thalia at Symphony Space in New York City, featuring 13 national finalists, with Michelle León of the host state being crowned the winner. León later finished as the fourth runner-up at the 2016 Miss Grand International contest in Las Vegas, Nevada. Later in 2018, Martínez scheduled the 2018 contest to be held on May 28 in New York, but lost the franchise to Israel Silva and Hernan Rivera of H&I Grand Productions LLC, a Chicago-based event organizer that owned and organized the Miss Grand USA pageant from 2019 to 2023. The franchise was subsequently transferred to the e-commerce company Protagonist Live LLC in early 2024, with former Miss Grand Ireland 2023, Rachel Slawson, serving as president under Iron Tiara LLC. On December 6, 2024, Crown Legacy LLC assumed management of the franchise, while production continued under Protagonist Live LLC.

Since its establishment, the pageant has been canceled only once, in 2020, due to the significant increase in COVID-19 infections across the country. The organizer subsequently appointed Ghanaian American model Abena Appiah to represent the United States at the international competition in Thailand, where she won the title, becoming the first American representative to win Miss Grand International and the first Black contestant to do so.

== Editions ==
=== Location and date ===
The following list is the edition detail of the Miss Grand USA contest, since its inception in 2016.

Year	Edition	Date	Final venue	Host State	Entrants	Ref.
2016	1st	28 May	Leonard Nimoy Thalia, Symphony Space, New York City	New York	13	
2017	2nd	25 Jul	Leonard Nimoy Thalia, Symphony Space, New York City	New York	17	
2019	3rd	11 Aug	Lincolnshire Marriott Resort, Lake County	Illinois	28	
2021	4th	20 Jun	Joe's Live Rosemont, Rosemont	Illinois	18	
2022	5th	23 Jun	Copernicus Center, Chicago	Illinois	12	
2023	6th	17 Aug	Crowne Plaza Chicago O'Hare Hotel & Conference Center	Illinois	25	
2024	7th	12 Aug	Club M2, Miami	Florida	19	
2025	8th	18 Aug	Rio Showroom at Rio Las Vegas, Las Vegas	Nevada	31	
2026	9th	10 Aug	Rio Showroom at Rio Las Vegas, Las Vegas	Nevada	29	

=== Competition results ===
Year	Miss Grand United States	Runners-up				Ref.
Year	Miss Grand United States	1st runner-up	2nd runner-up	3rd runner-up	4th runner-up	Ref.
2016	Michelle León (New York)	Heather Jorgensen (Illinois)	Melissa Martinez (Mississippi)	Not Awarded		
2017	Taylor Kessler^{[β]} (California)	Brianna Key (Louisiana)	Alexi Gropper (Georgia)	Courtney Williams (Maryland)	Leidy Guzman (Rhode Island)	
2019	Emily Delgado^{[γ]} (Nevada)	Alexandria Kelly (Michigan)	Que Demery (Florida)	Shiobhan Fraser (Georgia)	Stormy Keffeler (Washington)	
2021	Madison Callaghan (North Carolina)	Taylor Gipson (Tennessee)	Gennesis Padron (Mid-Atlantic)	Sydney Salinas (Texas)	Emily Argo (Illinois)	
2022	Emily DeMure^{[ε]} (Colorado)	Mercia Stephens (Ohio)	Brooke Butler (Kansas)	Not Awarded		
2023	Sthephanie Miranda^{[ϝ]} (Great Lakes)	Samantha Keaton (Illinois)	Rachel Slawson (New York)	Francie Millan (Texas)	Mazzy Eckel (Washington)	
2024	Cora Griffen^{[ζ]} (Georgia)	Tiajah Elliott (New Jersey)	Victoria Oluwakotanmi (Illinois)	Andrea Valentina (Florida)	Giselle Burgos (Arizona)	
2025	Ivana Garcia (Ohio)	Andrea Valentina Nuñez (East Coast)	Rachelle Di Stasio (Washington)	Christianah Adejokun (Southern States)	Emely Aleman (Tennessee)	
2026	Mekyla Li (Massachusetts)	Victoria Oluwakotanmi (Indiana)	Francie Millan (Louisiana)	Shelbi Byrnes (Nevada)	Alma Gonzalez (New Mexico)	

== International competition ==
Year	Delegate	National qualification	Competition Placement	Special Awards	National director(s)	Ref.
2013	Blair Griffith^{[α]}	Miss Grand United States 2013	Top 20	—	Evan L. Skow	
2014	Sara Platt	Miss Grand United States 2014	Unplaced	—	Evan L. Skow	
2015	Lauren Petersen	Miss Grand United States 2015	Top 20	—	Evan L. Skow	
2016	Michelle León	Miss Grand United States 2016	4th Runner-Up	—	Chantel Martínez	
2017	Taylor Kessler^{[β]}	Miss Grand United States 2017	Unplaced	—	Chantel Martínez	
2018	Paola Cossyleon	Appointment	Unplaced	—	Israel Silva & Hernan Rivera	
2019	Emily Delgado^{[γ]}	Miss Grand United States 2019	Unplaced	—	Israel Silva & Hernan Rivera	
2020	Abena Appiah^{[δ]}	Appointment	Miss Grand International 2020	—	Israel Silva & Hernan Rivera	
2021	Madison Callaghan	Miss Grand United States 2021	Unplaced	—	Israel Silva & Hernan Rivera	
2022	Emily DeMure^{[ε]}	Miss Grand United States 2022	Unplaced	—	Israel Silva & Hernan Rivera	
2023	Sthephanie Miranda^{[ϝ]}	Miss Grand United States 2023	3rd Runner-Up	—	Israel Silva & Hernan Rivera	
2024	Cora Griffen^{[ζ]}	Miss Grand United States 2024	Unplaced	—	Rachel Slawson	
2025	Ivana Garcia	Miss Grand United States 2025	Top 22		Rachel Slawson	
2026	Mekyla Li	Miss Grand United States 2026	Dethroned		Candace Thomas & Sthephanie Miranda	
2026	Victoria Oluwakotanmi	Miss Grand United States 2026	Top 25		Candace Thomas & Sthephanie Miranda	
Note: 1. ^α Previously Miss Colorado Teen USA 2006 and Miss Colorado USA 2011.; 2. ^β Later Miss Texas USA 2020.; 3. ^γ Also Miss Supranational Nevada 2019.; 4. ^δ Previously Top Model of the World Ghana 2013, Miss Universe Ghana 2014 & Miss Earth Ghana 2019.; 5. ^ε Previously Miss Colorado USA 2020.; 6. ^ϝ Previously Miss Ohio USA 2020.; 7. ^ζ Previously Miss Georgia USA 2021.

=== Winner gallery ===
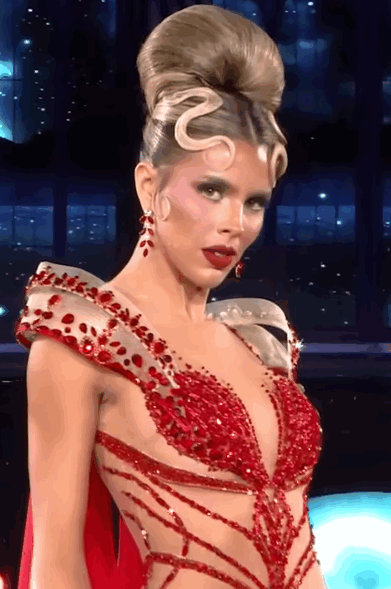
Miss Grand USA 2025
Ivana Garcia
(Ohio)

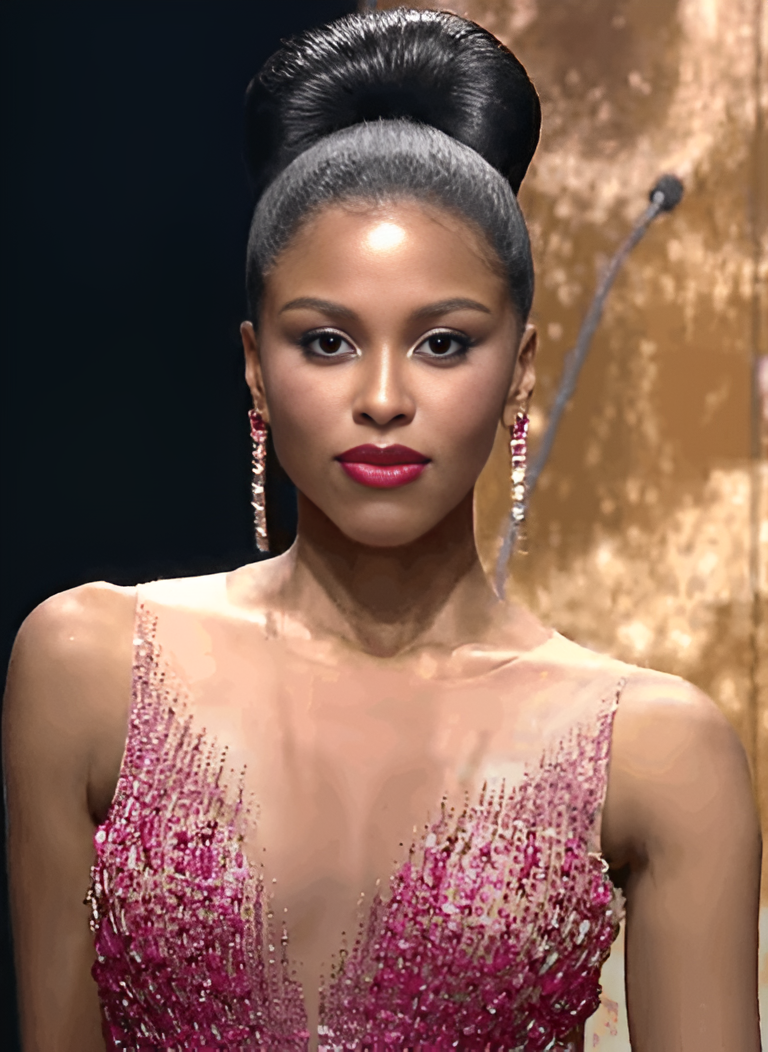
Miss Grand USA 2024
Cora Griffen
(Georgia)

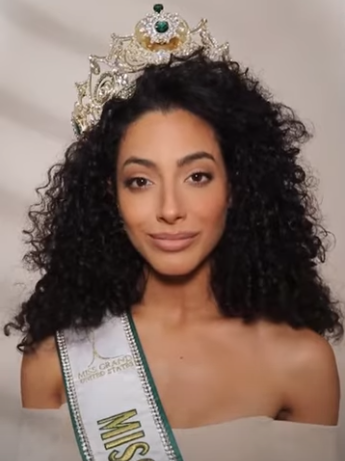
Miss Grand USA 2023
Sthephanie Miranda
(Great Lakes)

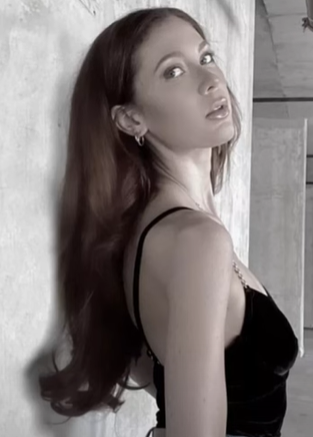
Miss Grand USA 2022
Emily DeMure
(Colorado)

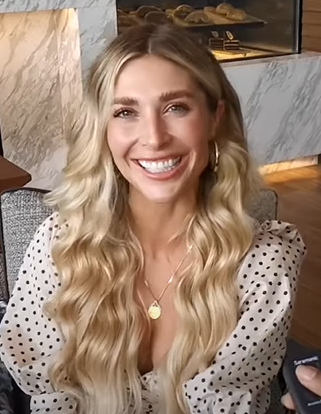
Miss Grand USA 2021
Madison Callaghan
(North Carolina)

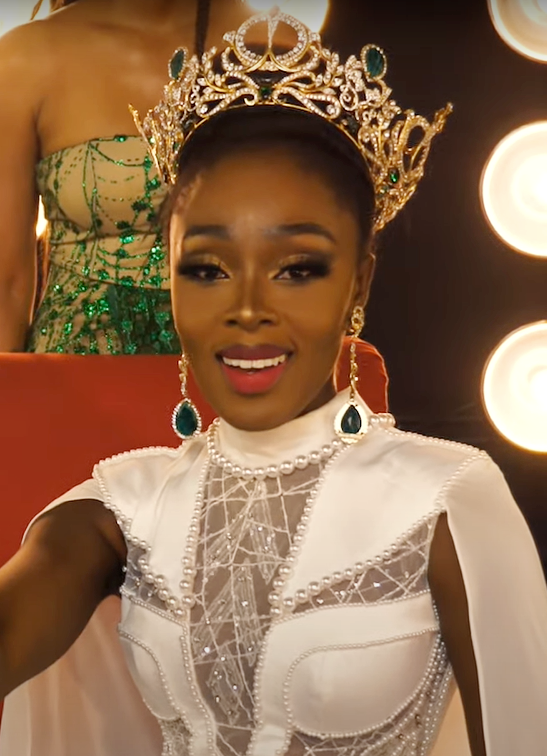
Miss Grand USA 2020
Abena Appiah
(New York)

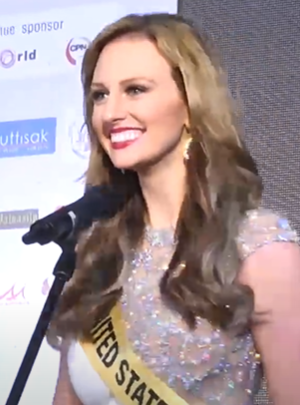
Miss Grand USA 2015
Lauren Petersen
(Virginia)

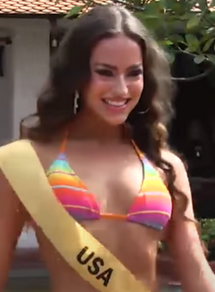
Miss Grand USA 2014
Sara Platt
(South Carolina)

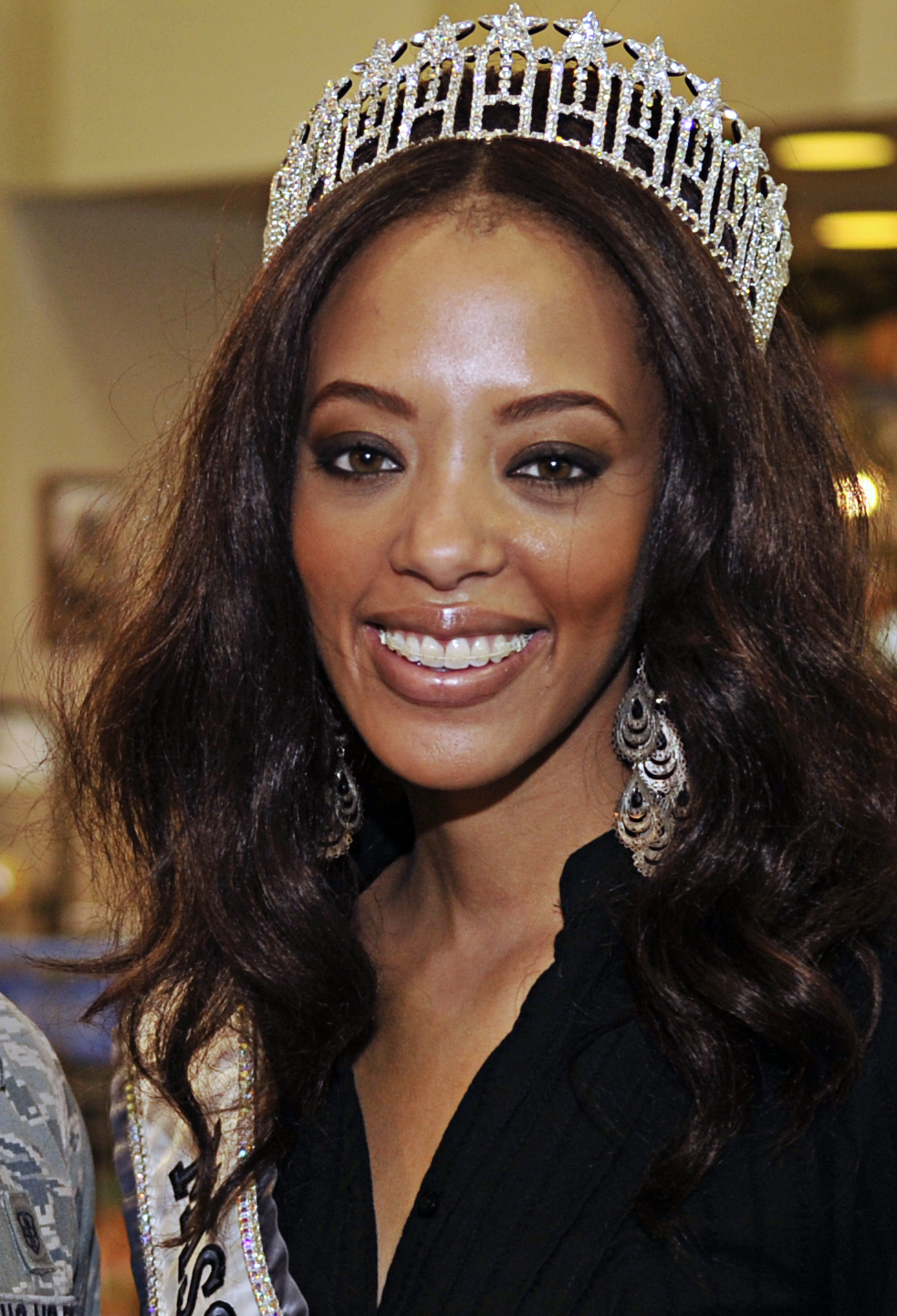
Miss Grand USA 2013
Blair Griffith
(Colorado)

States by number of wins

List of states by number of Miss Grand USA wins
Number of wins	State	Years
2	Colorado	2013, 2022
2	New York	2016, 2020
1	North Carolina	2021
1	Nevada	2019
1	Illinois	2018
1	California	2017
1	Virginia	2015
1	South Carolina	2014

== National finalists ==
The following list is the national finalists of the Miss Grand USA pageant, as well as the competition results.

Editions Represented	1st	2nd	3rd	4th	5th	6th	7th	8th	9th
States and the federal district
Alabama			Y					Y	Y
Alaska			Y						
Arizona			10	Y		Y		Y	Y
Arizona			Y	Y		Y		Y	Y
Arkansas									
California	Y		16	Y	6	10	8	Y	Y
Colorado	Y		16	Y		Y	12	20	Y
Colorado	Y		Y	Y		Y	12	20	Y
Connecticut	Y	Y	Y				Y		Y
Delaware			Y						Y
District of Columbia			Y	Y		15		Y	Y
Florida	Y	10		10	Y	10		10	Y
Georgia				10		10		20	Y
Hawaii			10			10		20	Y
Idaho									
Illinois		10	Y					20	Y
Indiana						Y		Y	Y
Iowa				Y					
Kansas			Y	Y					
Kentucky				Y				Y	
Louisiana			Y		Y	Y	Y		Y
Maine					Y			Y	
Maryland	Y			10		15			Y
Massachusetts	Y	10	Y				Y		Y
Michigan				Y		Y		20	Y
Minnesota			Y	Y	Y		12		
Mississippi		10	16	Y	Y				
Missouri				Y		Y	Y		
Montana				Y					
Nebraska			Y						
Nevada	Y	Y		Y		Y	12	Y	Y
New Hampshire									
New Jersey	5		10			15		20	Y
New Mexico			Y			Y	12	Y	Y
New York		Y	10	10	6		8	10	Y
North Carolina			Y			Y		10	Y
North Dakota									
Ohio		Y	Y	10		Y			Y
Oklahoma			16						
Oregon			16	Y					Y
Pennsylvania	5		16	Y	Y	10		Y	Y
Rhode Island				Y			Y		Y
South Carolina		Y	Y				Y		Y
South Dakota									
Tennessee		Y	Y						Y
Texas	Y	10	10		6		8	20	Y
Utah									Y
Vermont		Y							
Virginia			Y	Y			Y	20	Y
Washington				Y			Y		
West Virginia									Y
Wisconsin								20	Y
Wyoming									
Non-state representatives
Atlantic									
Central New York								20	
East Coast									
Golden Coast								Y	
Great Lakes									
Mid-Atlantic				Y		Y			
New England						Y			
North Atlantic								Y	
North East				Y		15			
Northern California								Y	
Silver State								Y	
South								10	
South Atlantic						Y			
South East						Y			
Southern States									
Tri-State						10			
West Coast						Y		10	
Total	13	17	28	18	12	24	19	31	29
Color keys: : Declared as the winner; : Ended as a 1st runner-up; : Ended as a 2nd runner-up; : Ended as a 3rd runner-up; : Ended as a 4th runner-up; A : Ended as a finalist, semifinalist or unplaced; × : Withdrew during the competition; × : No representative
