= Kingshill, U.S. Virgin Islands =

Coordinates: 17.72303°N 64.872364°W

Kingshill, Saint Croix, United States Virgin Islands
- Village
- Interactive map of Kingshill, Saint Croix, United States Virgin Islands
- Country: United States Virgin Islands
- Island: Saint Croix
- Time zone: UTC-4 (AST)
- ZIP code: 00851

Kingshill is a settlement on the island of Saint Croix in the United States Virgin Islands. It is home to the University of the Virgin Islands St. Croix campus, which opened in 1964.
