= Teatro 8 =

Theater venue in Miami, Florida

- Interactive map of Teatro 8
- Address: 2101 Southwest 8th Street; Miami, Florida; United States
- Coordinates: 25.766134°N 80.229408°W

Construction
- Opened: 2000

Website
- teatro8.com

Teatro 8 is a theater venue located in the Little Havana neighborhood of Miami, Florida.

== History ==
Teatro 8, which opened in 2000, was originally operated by the Hispanic Theater Guild, a Miami-based theater organization founded in 1989 with the involvement of Cuban American actor-director Marcos Casanova. Teatro 8 hosts frequent Spanish-language theater premiers, as well as productions of standards in the Hispanic theater repertoire. As of July 1, 2014, the venue will be managed by the Argentine group "Cirko Teatro," created by Jessica Alvarez Dieguez and Alejandro Vales.

== Production history ==
Teatro 8 has put on many successful productions since its conception in the year 2000. Their most notable have been:

“Cien Veces No Debo” A comedy written by Ricardo Talesnik

“Esperando la Carroza” An Argentine-Uruguayan classic written by Jacobo Lagsner

“Deliciosa Provocacion” A story written by Santiago Escalante

“Las Novias de Travolta” A comedy written by Andres Tulipano

“Bajo Terapia” A comedy written by Matias Del Frederico

“El Principio de Arquimedes” A controversial history lesson written by Josep Maria Miro

“TOC TOC” A comedy written by Laurent Baffie
