= Miss Grand United States 2022 =

5th edition of the Miss Grand United States competition

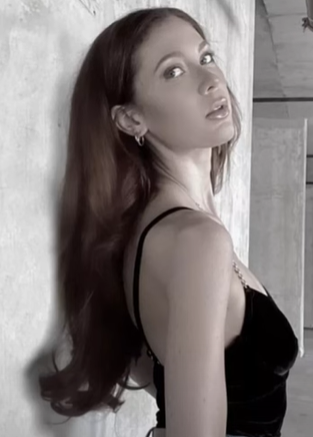
- Emily DeMure, the winner of the contest
- Date: June 23, 2022
- Presenters: Alexandria Kelly and Paola Cossyleon
- Venue: Copernicus Center, Chicago, Illinois
- Entrants: 12
- Placements: 6
- Debuts: Maine
- Withdrawals: Atlantic; Georgia; Illinois; Kentucky; Maryland; Missouri; Nevada; North Carolina; Tennessee; Washington
- Returns: Louisiana; Mississippi; Pennsylvania
- Winner: Emily DeMure (Colorado
- Congeniality: Darcy Nguyen (Louisiana)
- Photogenic: Florence Garcia (Florida)

External videos
- Miss Grand United States 2022 Finals
- 2022 Miss Grand USA Finals by H&I Grand Productions LLC

Miss Grand United States 2022 was the fifth edition of the Miss Grand USA pageant, held on June 23, 2022 at Copernicus Center, Chicago. Twelve candidates chosen through state pageant or national casting competed for the title, of whom the representative of Colorado, Emily DeMure, was announced the winner. She then represented the country in the Miss Grand International 2022 in Indonesia, but got a non-placement.

The contest was hosted by Paola Cossyleon and Alexandria Kelly, and held in parallel with Miss Eco International and Miss Eco Teen International, in which the winners of the Miss Eco categories later participated at the international contests in Egypt.

== Results ==
=== Placements ===
| Placement | Contestant |
|---|---|
| Miss Grand USA 2022 | Colorado – Emily DeMure |
| 1st runner-up | Ohio – Mercia Stephens |
| 2nd runner-up | Kansas – Brooke Butler |
| Top 6 | California – Bibyana Marquez; New York – Maxine Cesar; Texas – Juanita Maldonado |

=== Special awards ===
| Award | Contestant |
|---|---|
| Miss Congeniality | Louisiana - Darcy Nguyen |
| Miss Photogenic | Florida - Florence Garcia |
| Miss Humanitarian | Minnesota - Annais Loko |
| Miss People's Choice | California - Bibyana Marquez |

== Contestants ==
12 State titleholders competed for the national title.

| State | Contestant |
|---|---|
| California | Bibyana Marquez |
| Colorado | Emily Demure |
| Florida | Florence Garcia |
| Kansas | Brooke Butler |
| Louisiana | Darcy Nguyen |
| Maine | Susie Damm |
| Massachusetts | Chtistella Ilunga (withdrew) |
| Minnesota | Annais Loko |
| Mississippi | Jessica Fields |
| New York | Maxine Cesar |
| Ohio | Mercia Stephens |
| Pennsylvania | Jennifer Santiago |
| Texas | Juanita Maldonado |
