= Miss Grand United States 2021 =

4th edition of the Miss Grand United States competition

- Date: June 20, 2021
- Venue: Joe's Live Rosemont, Rosemont, Illinois
- Broadcaster: GrandTV
- Entrants: 18
- Placements: 10
- Debuts: Atlantic; Kentucky; Missouri
- Withdrawals: Alabama; Alaska; Arizona; Connecticut; Delaware; Hawaii; Louisiana; Massachusetts; Michigan; Mississippi; Nebraska; New Jersey; New Mexico; Oklahoma; Oregon; Pennsylvania; South Carolina; Virginia; Washington, D.C.
- Returns: Maryland
- Winner: Madison Callaghan (North Carolina)

External videos
- Miss Grand United States 2021 Finals
- 2021 Miss Grand USA Finals by H&I Grand Productions LLC

Miss Grand United States 2021 was the fourth edition of the Miss Grand USA pageant, held at Joe's Live Rosemont, Rosemont, Illinois on June 20, 2021. Eighteen state representatives, either chosen through state pageants or national online casting, competed for the title, of whom the representative from North Carolina, Madison Callaghan, was announced the winner. She later represented the United States at Miss Grand International 2021 in Bangkok, Thailand,

== Results ==
Miss Grand USA 2021; 18 national finalists

=== Placements ===
Placement	Contestant
Miss Grand USA 2021	North Carolina – Madison Callaghan
1st Runner-Up	Tennessee – Taylor Gipson
2nd Runner-Up	Mid-Atlantic – Gennesis Padron
3rd Runner-Up	Texas – Sydney Salinas
4th Runner-Up	Illinois – Emily Rae Argo
Top 10	Florida – Bella Logins; Georgia – Nicole Monserrat; Maryland – Brianna Rea Lopez; New York – Ashley Sánchez; Ohio – Moazmah Gill

== Contestants ==
18 national contestants competed for the title of Miss Grand United States 2021.

State/Locality	Contestant
Atlantic	Gennesis Padron
California	Nyakoach Lam
Colorado	Lizeth Morales Tena
Florida	Bella Logins
Georgia	Nicole Monserrat
Illinois	Emily Rae Argo
Kansas	Ileana Flores
Kentucky	Ramya Kondaveeti
Maryland	Brianna Rea Lopez
Minnesota	Việt Mĩ Nguyễn
Missouri	Tyler Liane Prugh
Nevada	Miranda Contreras (Note: As the replacement for Karla D. Villezcas.)
New York	Ashley Sánchez
North Carolina	Madison Callaghan
Ohio	Moazmah Gill
Tennessee	Taylor Gipson
Texas	Sydney Salinas
Washington	Vanessa Guerrero
Withdrawn candidates
Arizona	Annaka Jordan
Iowa	Faith Bernadette
Michigan	Malia Lopez
Mid-Atlantic	Faith Porter
Mississippi	Dana Wesley
Montana	Shannon MacNeil
Northeast	Jordian M. Siver
Oregon	Jasmin Arevalo-Larios
Pennsylvania	Madison Rivera (Note: As the replacement for Jennifer Santiago)
Rhode Island	Alexa Cardona
Virginia	Trerese Roberts
Washington, D.C.	Faatima Brown
