= Miss Grand United States 2016 =

1st edition of the Miss Grand United States competition

- Date: May 28, 2016
- Venue: Leonard Nimoy Thalia, Symphony Space, New York City
- Entrants: 13
- Placements: 5
- Debuts: California; Colorado; Connecticut; Florida; Illinois; Maryland; Massachusetts; Mississippi; Nevada; New Jersey; New York; Pennsylvania; Texas
- Winner: Michelle Leon (New York)

Miss Grand United States 2016 was the first edition of the Miss Grand USA pageant, held on May 28, 2016, at Leonard Nimoy Thalia, Symphony Space, New York City. Thirteen national delegates competed for the title, of whom the representative of New York, Michelle Leon, was announced the winner. She then represented the country at the Miss Grand International 2016 pageant in Las Vegas, and was named the fourth runner-up.

== Results ==
Miss Grand USA 2016; 13 national finalists

Final results	Contestant
Miss Grand USA 2016	New York – Michelle Leon
1st Runner-Up	Illinois – Heather Jorgensen
2nd Runner-Up	Mississippi – Melissa Martinez
Top 5	New Jersey – Karina Lopez; Pennsylvania – Jodelis Diaz

== Contestants ==
Thirteen state titleholders competed for the national title.

State	Contestant
California	Jen Sidorova
Colorado	Kelly Cardona
Connecticut	Naomi Arias
Florida	Stephanie Camacho
Illinois	Heather Jorgensen
Maryland	Karol Melendez
Massachusetts	Caroline Placzek
Mississippi	Melissa Martinez
Nevada	Chelynel Sanchez
New Jersey	Karina Lopez
New York	Michelle Leon
Pennsylvania	Jodelis Diaz
Texas	Alaina Pereyna
