= Miss Grand United States 2017 =

1st edition of the Miss Grand United States competition

- Date: July 25, 2017
- Presenters: Geovanni Mazariego
- Venue: Leonard Nimoy Thalia, Symphony Space, New York City
- Entrants: 17
- Placements: 10
- Debuts: Georgia; Louisiana; Ohio; Rhode Island; South Carolina; Tennessee; Vermont
- Withdrawals: Colorado; New Jersey; Pennsylvania
- Winner: Taylor Kessler (California)

Miss Grand United States 2017 was the second edition of the Miss Grand USA pageant, held on July 25, 2017, at the Leonard Nimoy Thalia, Symphony Space, New York City. Contestants from seventeen U.S. states competed for the title, of whom the representative of California, Taylor Kessler, was announced the winner. She then represented the United States at Miss Grand International 2017 in Vietnam, but did not qualify to the top 10 finalists.

In addition to the main winner, the first runner-up, Brianna Key, was later appointed as Miss Grand United States Virgin Islands 2017 to compete internationally in Vietnam but also received a non-placement.

== Results ==
Miss Grand USA 2017; 17 national finalists

Final results	Contestant
Miss Grand USA 2017	California - Taylor Kessler
1st runner-up	Louisiana - Brianna Key
2nd runner-up	Georgia - Alexi Gropper
3rd runner-up	Maryland - Courtney Williams
4th runner-up	Rhode Island - Leidy Guzman
Top 10	Florida - Tyeshaa Hudson; Illinois - Leah Weatherford; Massachusetts - Ana Solano; Mississippi - Melissa Martinez; Texas - Courtney Newman

== Contestants ==
All 17 titleholders have been crowned.

State	Contestant
California	Taylor Kessler
Connecticut	Amber Walker
Florida	Tyeshaa Hudson
Georgia	Alexi Gropper
Illinois	Leah Weatherford
Louisiana	Brianna Key
Maryland	Courtney Williams
Massachusetts	Ana Solano
Mississippi	Melissa Martinez
Nevada	Ellen Kincaid
New York	Chanise Thomas
Ohio	Summer Sadiyeh
Rhode Island	Leidy Guzman
South Carolina	Verhonda Crawford
Tennessee	Autumn Endsley
Texas	Courtney Newman
Vermont	Noelia Baez
