= Miss Grand United States 2019 =

3rd edition of the Miss Grand United States competition

- Date: August 11, 2019
- Venue: Lincolnshire Marriott Resort, Lake County
- Entrants: 28
- Placements: 16
- Debuts: Alabama; Alaska; Arizona; Delaware; Hawaii; Kansas; Michigan; Minnesota; Nebraska; New Mexico; North Carolina; Oklahoma; Oregon; Virginia; Washington; Washington, D.C.
- Withdrawals: Maryland; Rhode Island; Vermont
- Returns: Colorado; New Jersey; Pennsylvania
- Winner: Emily Irene Delgado (Nevada)

External videos
- Miss Grand United States 2019 Finals
- 2019 Miss Grand USA Finals by H&I Grand Productions LLC

Miss Grand United States 2019 was the third edition of the Miss Grand USA pageant, held on August 11, 2019, at Lincolnshire Marriott Resort, Lake County, Illinois. Contestants from twenty-eight U.S. states competed for the title, of whom the representative of Nevada, Emily Irene Delgado, was named the winner. She then represented the United States at Miss Grand International 2019 in Venezuela on 25 October, but got a non-placement.

== Results ==
Miss Grand USA 2019 competition result by state

| Final results | Contestant |
|---|---|
| Miss Grand USA 2019 | Nevada - Emily Irene Delgado |
| 1st runner-up | Michigan - Alexandria Kelly |
| 2nd runner-up | Florida - Que Demery |
| 3rd runner-up | Georgia - Shiobhan Fraser |
| 4th runner-up | Washington - Stormy Keffeler |
| Top 10 | Arizona - Myriam Rochin; Hawaii - Stephanie Wang; New Jersey - Mayelin De La Cruz; New York - Heather Thompson; Texas - Anastasia Semenova |
| Top 16 | California - Ereka Lambe; Colorado - Ashley Marian Avila; Mississippi - Latora Melly Bemley; Oklahoma - Stephanie Ariza Ramírez; Oregon - Melony Escobar; Pennsylvania - Smaroling Esther |

== Contestants ==
28 contestants competed for the title.

| State | Contestant |
|---|---|
| Alabama | Alesha McNeese |
| Alaska | Abigail González (withdrew) |
| Arizona | Myriam Rochin |
| Arizona | Nadia Monique |
| California | Ereka Lambe (Note: As the replacement for Sarah Steria.) |
| Colorado | Ashley Marian Avila |
| Colorado | Sabrina Smith (withdrew) |
| Connecticut | Kathyria Burgos |
| Delaware | Eddia Jane Watts |
| Florida | Que Demery |
| Georgia | Shiobhan Fraser Smith |
| Hawaii | Stephanie Wang |
| Illinois | Karah West (Note: As the replacement for Samantha Molina.) |
| Kansas | Beth Wiese (withdrew) |
| Louisiana | Mayura Kulkarni (Note: As the replacement for Linda Okoli.) |
| Massachusetts | Paradise Rodriguez (withdrew) |
| Michigan | Alexandria Kelly |
| Minnesota | Katerina Katakalides |
| Mississippi | Latora Melly Bemley |
| Nebraska | Brenda Melissa Ramod |
| Nevada | Emily Delgado (Note: As the replacement for Parand Biranvand.) |
| New Jersey | Mayelin de la Cruz |
| New Mexico | Gabriela Raiciof |
| New York | Heather Thompson |
| North Carolina | Miriam Marie |
| Ohio | Natalia Chelsy Cordero (withdrew) |
| Oklahoma | Stephanie Ariza Ramírez |
| Oregon | Melony Escobar |
| Pennsylvania | Smaroling Esther |
| South Carolina | Angelia Williams |
| Tennessee | Byrgundy Mallory |
| Texas | Anastasia Semenova |
| Virginia | Naomi Rahn (withdrew) |
| Washington | Stormy Keffeler |
| Washington, D.C. | Luciana Davalos Brown (Note: As the replacement for Faatima Brown.) (withdrew) |
