= Miss Grand United States 2023 =

6th edition of the Miss Grand United States competition

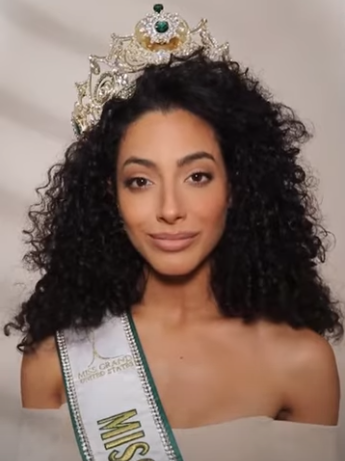
- Sthephanie Miranda
- Date: August 17, 2023
- Venue: Crowne Plaza Chicago O'Hare Hotel & Conference Center, Chicago, Illinois
- Entrants: 24
- Placements: 15
- Debuts: Great Lakes; Mid-Atlantic; New England; Northeast; Tri-State; West Coast
- Withdrawals: Kansas; Maine; Minnesota; Mississippi
- Returns: District of Columbia; Georgia; Hawaii; Illinois; Maryland; Michigan; Missouri; Nevada; New Jersey; Washington
- Winner: Sthephanie Miranda; Great Lakes
- Congeniality: Teyana Adams, Ohio

External videos
- Miss Grand United States 2023 Finals
- 2023 Miss Grand USA Finals by H&I Grand Productions LLC

Miss Grand United States 2023 was the sixth edition of the Miss Grand USA pageant, held on August 17, 2023 at the Crowne Plaza Chicago O'Hare Hotel & Conference Center, Chicago. Twenty-four candidates chosen through state pageant or national casting competed for the title, of whom the representative of Great Lakes, Sthephanie Miranda, was announced the winner. She represented the United States at Miss Grand International 2023 held in Vietnam on October 25, 2023, and became third runner-up to Luciana Fuster of Peru.

Contestants from Florida and Texas were selected through state pageants, while the remainder were appointed.

== Results ==
Placement	Contestant
Miss Grand USA 2023	Great Lakes – Sthephanie Miranda
1st runner-up	Illinois – Samantha Keaton
2nd runner-up	New York City – Rachel Slawson
3rd runner-up	Texas – Francie Millan
4th runner-up	Washington – Mazzy Eckel
Top 10	California – Rebecca Edwards; Florida – Ivana Valentina Garcia; Georgia – Kennedy Thomas; Pennsylvania – Ebone Marie Jimerson; Tri-state – Maxine Cesar
Top 15	District of Columbia – Natalia Salmon; Hawaii – Jena Masero; Maryland – Amanda Bertholf; New Jersey – Christine Pierre; Northeast – Joselyn Farias
Special awards
Miss Congeniality	Ohio – Teyana Adams
Miss People's Vote	Pennsylvania – Ebone Marie Jimerson

== Contestants ==
24 State titleholders competed for the national title.

Miss Grand United States 2023 competition result
Color key:
Winner	Top 10
1st runner-up	Top 15
2nd runner-up	Unplaced
3rd runner-up	No representative
4th runner-up

State/Region	Contestant
California	Rebecca Edwards
Colorado	Kylie Klein
District of Columbia	Natalia Salmon
Florida	Ivana Valentina Garcia
Georgia	Kennedy Thomas
Great Lakes	Sthephanie Miranda
Hawaii	Jena Masero
Illinois	Samantha Keaton
Louisiana	Bri Hunter
Maryland	Amanda Bertholf
Michigan	Morgan Pickrell
Mid-Atlantic	LeslieAnn Padilla
Missouri	Rachel Ringgenberg
Nevada	July Garza
New England	Alanna V. Hepbun
New Jersey	Christine Pierre
New York City	Rachel Slawson
Northeast	Joselyn Farias
Ohio	Teyana Adams
Pennsylvania	Ebone Marie Jimerson
Texas	Francie Millan
Tri-state	Maxine Cesar
Washington	Mazzy Eckel
West Coast	Alexandra Marie Gill

=== Did not compete ===
- Arizona - Sierra Rothacker
- Indiana - Barbara Satine
- New Mexico - Jacqueline Mata
- North Carolina - London Tucker
- South Atlantic - Alexis D Williams
- South East - Chinelo Aniekwu
