= List of Miss Grand International titleholders =

List of Miss Grand International winners (2013–present)

The following is a list of Miss Grand International titleholders from the competition's inaugural edition in 2013 to the pageant's most recent run in 2026.

== Miss Grand International titleholders ==
Year	Country/Territory	Titleholder	Age (Note: Ages at the time of Miss Grand International.)	Hometown	National Title	Location	Date	Entrants
2013	Puerto Rico	Janelee Chaparro	22	Barceloneta	Miss Grand Puerto Rico 2013	Nonthaburi, Thailand	November 19, 2013	71
2014	Cuba	Lees Garcia	27	Miami	Miss Grand Cuba 2014	Bangkok, Thailand	October 7, 2014	85
2015	Dominican Republic	Anea Garcia (Dethroned) (Note: Anea Garcia was dethroned because she could not fulfill her duties during her reign as Miss Grand International.)	20	Cranston	Miss Grand Dominican Republic 2015	Bangkok, Thailand	October 25, 2015	77
2015	Australia	Claire Elizabeth Parker (Assumed) (Note: Claire Elizabeth Parker, the 2015 winner, was originally placed 1st Runner-Up but was assumed as the winner after the original titleholder was dethroned. Later, Parker terminated her title in 2019 for participating in Miss Universe Australia 2019 pageant.)	24	Sydney	Miss Grand Australia 2015	Bangkok, Thailand	April 1, 2016	77
2016	Indonesia	Ariska Putri Pertiwi	21	Medan	Puteri Indonesia Perdamaian 2016	Las Vegas, United States	October 25, 2016	74
2017	Peru	María José Lora	27	Trujillo	Miss Grand Peru 2017	Phú Quốc, Vietnam	October 25, 2017	77
2018	Paraguay	Clara Sosa	25	Asunción	Miss Grand Paraguay 2018	Yangon, Myanmar	October 25, 2018	75
2019	Venezuela	Valentina Figuera	19	Puerto La Cruz	El Concurso by Osmel Sousa 2018	Caracas, Venezuela	October 25, 2019	60
2020	United States	Abena Appiah	27	New York City	Miss Grand United States of America 2020	Bangkok, Thailand (Note: The 2020 edition was originally to be organized in Venezuela but was twice rescheduled to Bangkok, Thailand after the COVID-19 pandemic.)	March 27, 2021	63
2021	Vietnam	Nguyễn Thúc Thùy Tiên	23	Ho Chi Minh City	Miss Grand Vietnam 2021	Bangkok, Thailand	December 4, 2021	59
2022	Brazil	Isabella Menin	26	Marília	Miss Grand Brazil 2022	West Java, Indonesia	October 25, 2022	68
2023	Peru	Luciana Fuster	24	Callao	Miss Grand Peru 2023	Ho Chi Minh City, Vietnam	October 25, 2023	69
2024	India	Rachel Gupta (Dethroned)	20	Jalandhar	Miss Grand India 2024	Bangkok, Thailand (Note: The 2024 edition was originally to be organized in Myanmar but was rescheduled to Bangkok, Thailand after the Myanmar conflict.)	October 25, 2024	68
2024	Philippines	Christine Juliane Opiaza (Assumed)	26	Castillejos	Miss Grand Philippines 2024	Bangkok, Thailand	June 3, 2025	68
2025	Philippines	Emma Tiglao	30	Mabalacat	Miss Grand Philippines 2025	Bangkok, Thailand	October 18, 2025	77
2026	Tanzania	Jihan Dimack	30	Dar es Salaam	Miss Grand Tanzania 2026	Bangkok, Thailand	October 10, 2026	77

== Titleholders by country or territory ==
This list includes the titleholders of Miss Grand International by country or territory in ascending order.

Country or territory	Titles	Years
Philippines	2	2024; 2025
Peru	2	2017; 2023
Tanzania	1	2026
Brazil	1	2022
Vietnam	1	2021
United States	1	2020
Venezuela	1	2019
Paraguay	1	2018
Indonesia	1	2016
Australia	1	2015
Cuba	1	2014
Puerto Rico	1	2013

Assumed wins

Titles assumed following dethronements.

Country or territory	Titles	Years
Australia	1	2015
Philippines	1	2024

Continent or region	Titles	Years
Oceania	1	2015
Asia	1	2024

Dethroned wins

Country or territory	Titles	Years
Dominican Republic	1	2015
India	1	2024

Continent or region	Titles	Years
North America	1	2015
Asia	1	2024

Resigned not replaced wins

Country or territory	Titles	Years
Australia	1	2015

Continent or region	Titles	Years
Oceania	1	2015

Debut wins

Debut wins timeline
Decades	Country or territory
2010s	List: 2013: Puerto Rico; 2014: Cuba; 2015: Australia; 2016: Indonesia; 2017: Peru; 2018: Paraguay; 2019: Venezuela
2020s	List: 2020: United States; 2021: Vietnam; 2022: Brazil; 2024: Philippines; 2026: Tanzania

== Continents by number of wins ==
Continent or region	Titles	Years
South America	5	2017; 2018; 2019; 2022; 2023
Asia	4	2016; 2021; 2024; 2025
North America	3	2013; 2014; 2020
Africa	1	2026
Oceania	1	2015
Europe	0	

== Winners gallery ==
Miss Grand International 2026
Jihan Dimack
Tanzania

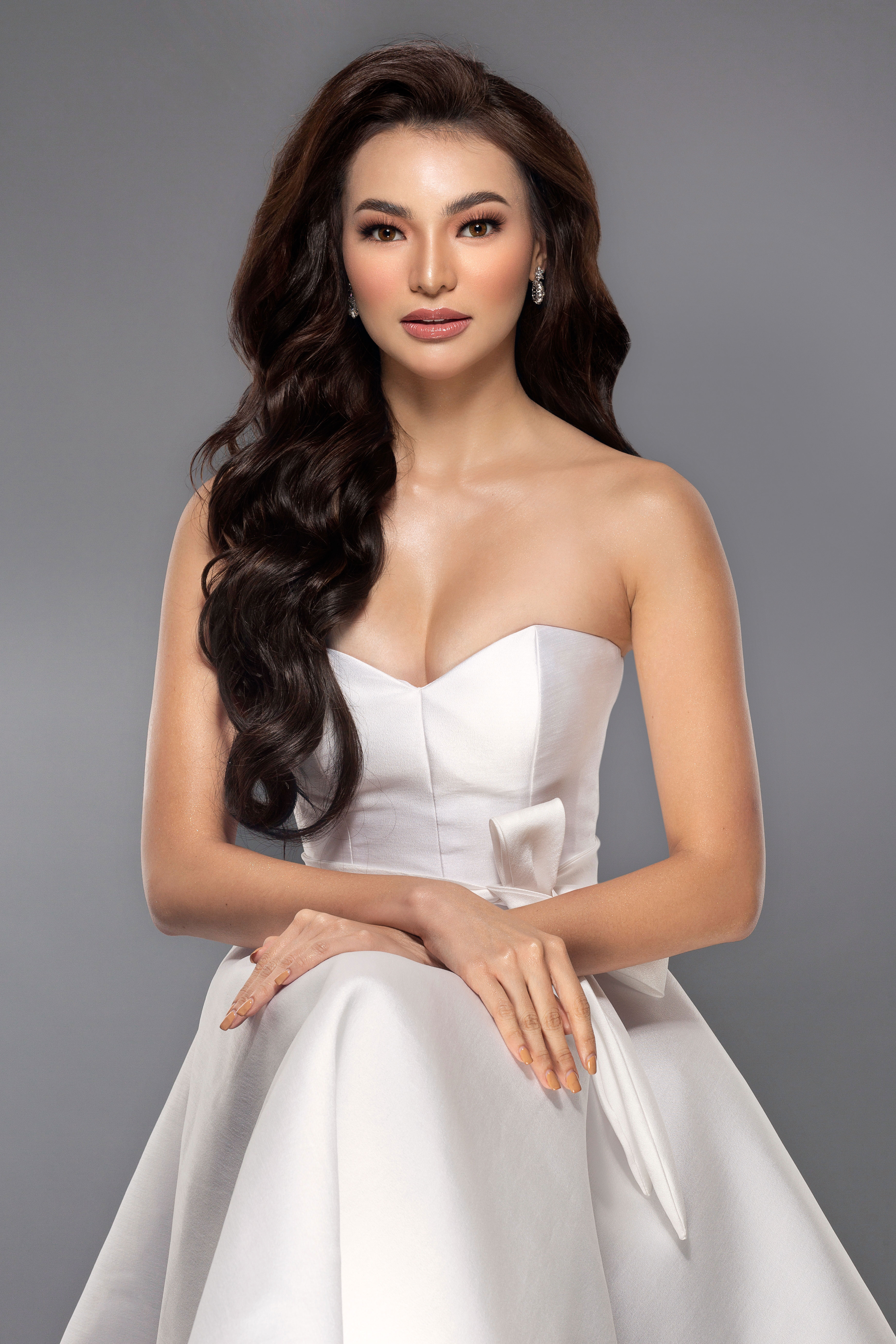
Miss Grand International 2025
Emma Tiglao
Philippines

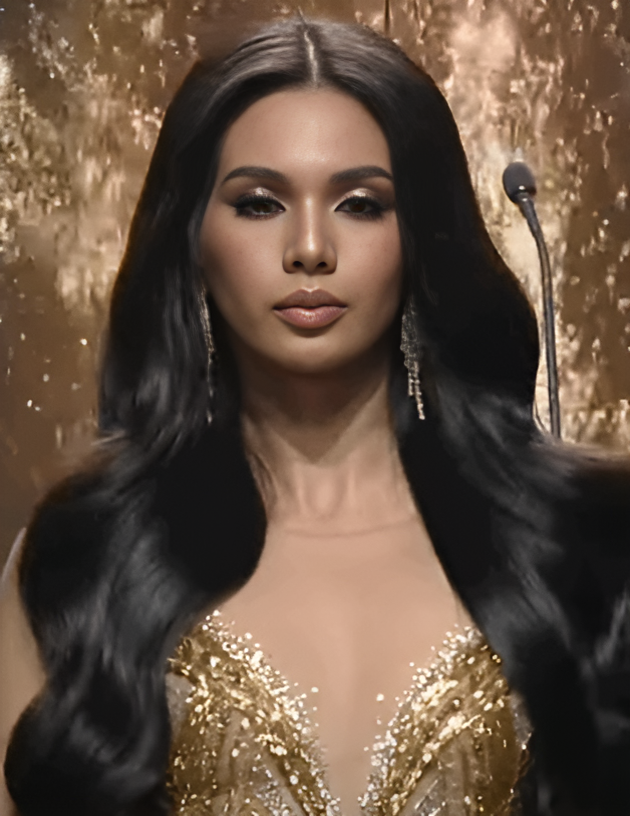
Miss Grand International 2024
Christine Juliane Opiaza
Philippines

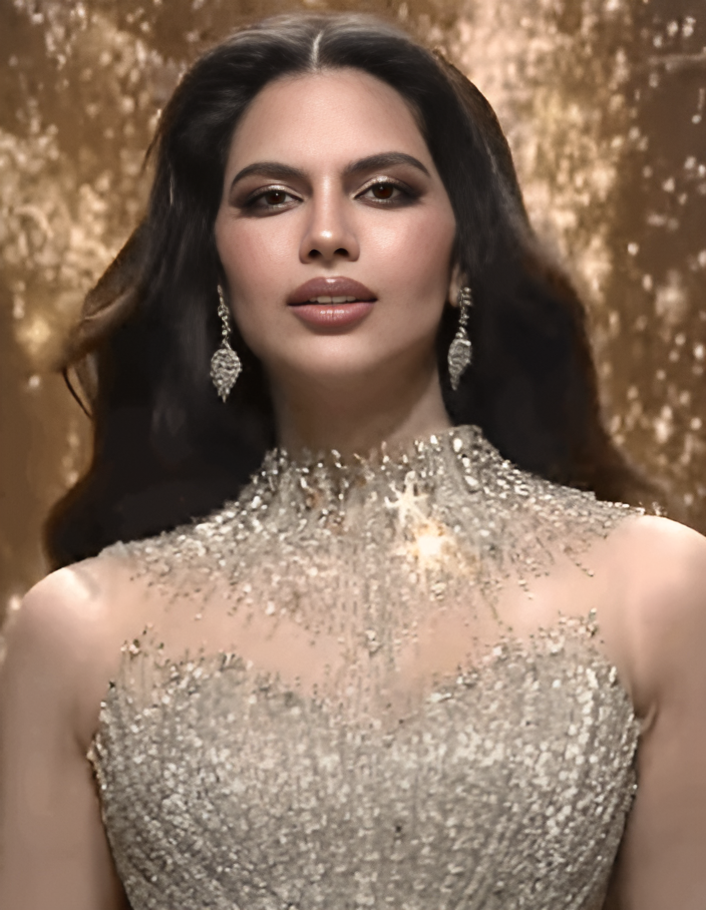
Miss Grand International 2024
(dethroned)
Rachel Gupta
India

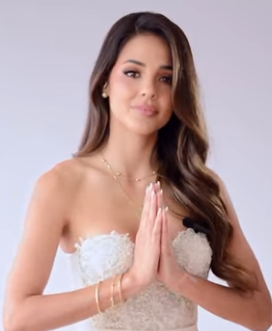
Miss Grand International 2023
Luciana Fuster
Peru

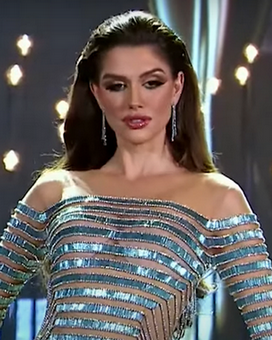
Miss Grand International 2022
Isabella Menin
Brazil

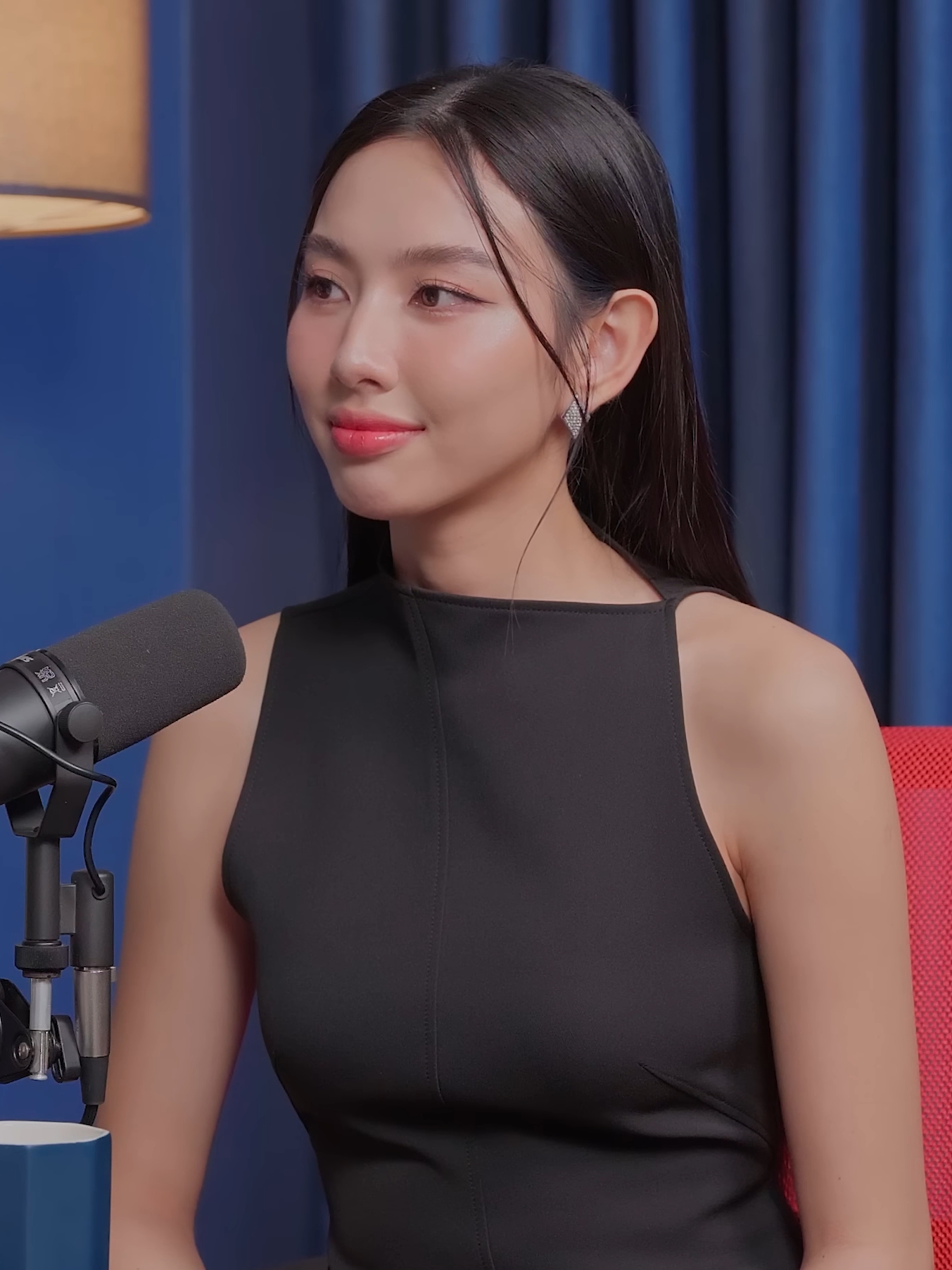
Miss Grand International 2021
Nguyễn Thúc Thùy Tiên
Vietnam

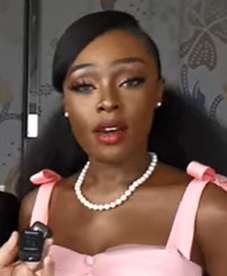
Miss Grand International 2020
Abena Appiah
United States

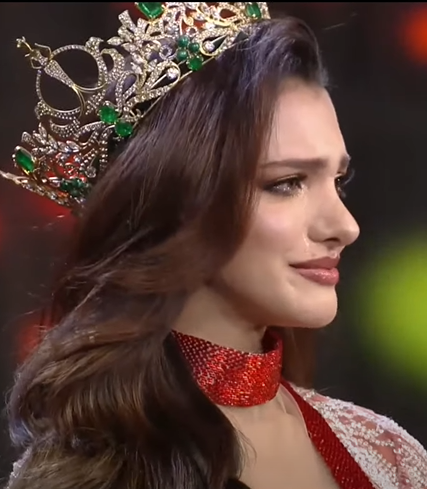
Miss Grand International 2019
Valentina Figuera
Venezuela

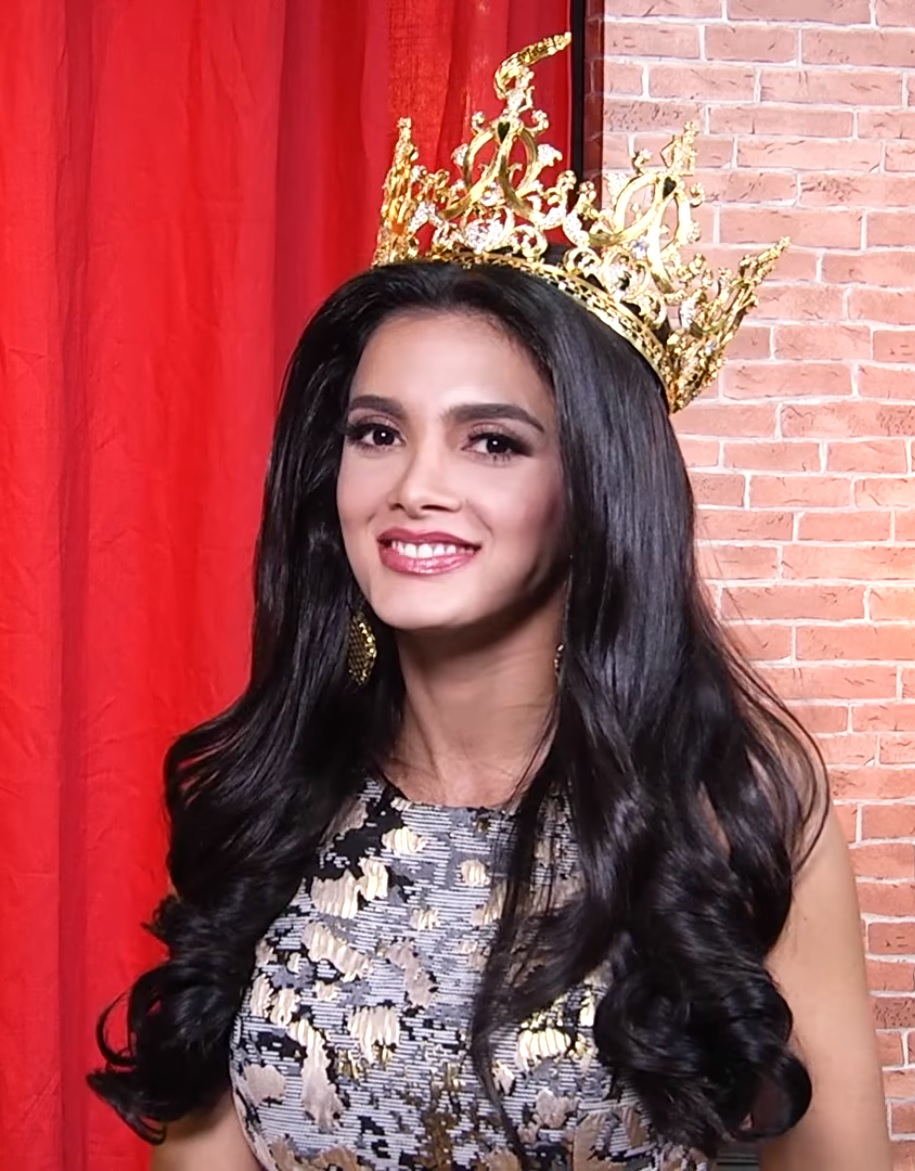
Miss Grand International 2018
Clara Sosa
Paraguay

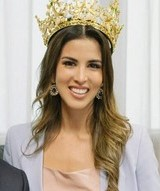
Miss Grand International 2017
María José Lora
Peru

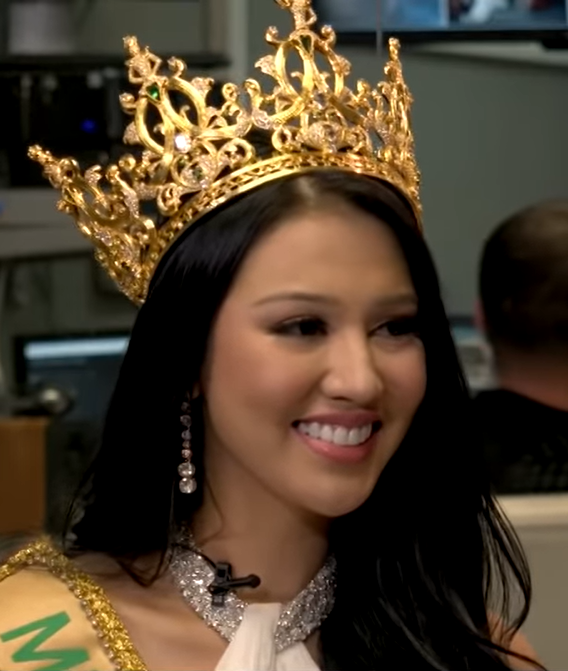
Miss Grand International 2016
Ariska Putri Pertiwi
Indonesia

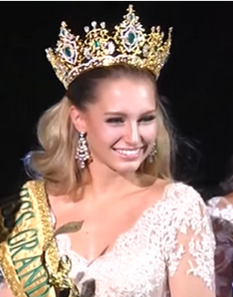
Miss Grand International 2015
Claire Elizabeth Parker
Australia

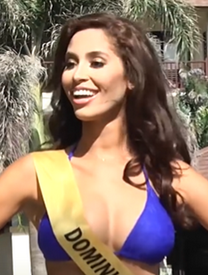
Miss Grand International 2015
(dethroned)
Anea García
Dominican Republic

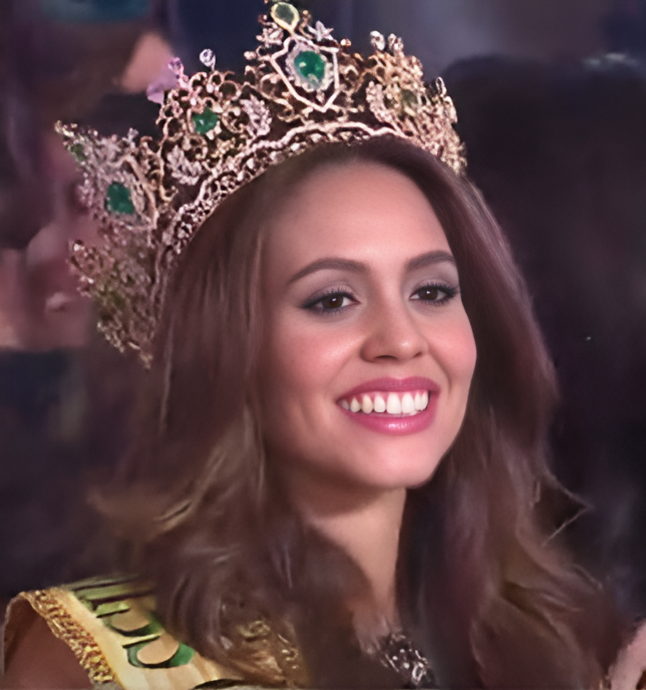
Miss Grand International 2014
Lees Garcia
Cuba

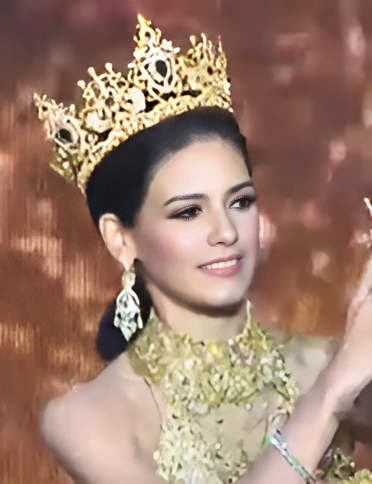
Miss Grand International 2013
Janelee Chaparro
Puerto Rico

== See also ==
- List of Miss Grand International editions
- List of Miss Grand International runners-up and finalists
- List of beauty pageants
