= List of Miss Grand International editions =

Editions of Miss Grand International

This is a list of Miss Grand International editions and host countries or territories since the inaugural edition of the competition in 2013 to the present.

== Editions ==
This list includes the winner, date, venue, and host country or territory, and total entrants of each Miss Grand International edition since the inaugural edition in 2013.

Year	Edition	Winner	Date	Venue	Host country or territory	Entrants	Ref.
2013	1st	Puerto Rico	November 19, 2013	Impact Arena, Muang Thong Thani, Nonthaburi	Thailand	71	
2014	2nd	Cuba	October 7, 2014	Indoor Stadium Huamark, Bangkok	Thailand	85	
2015	3rd	Dominican Republic (terminated)	October 25, 2015	Indoor Stadium Huamark, Bangkok	Thailand	77	
2015	3rd	Australia (assumed)	October 25, 2015	Indoor Stadium Huamark, Bangkok	Thailand	77	
2016	4th	Indonesia	October 25, 2016	Westgate Las Vegas, Las Vegas, Nevada	United States	74	
2017	5th	Peru	October 25, 2017	Vinpearl Convention Center, Phú Quốc	Vietnam	77	
2018	6th	Paraguay	October 25, 2018	The One Entertainment Park, Yangon	Myanmar	75	
2019	7th	Venezuela	October 25, 2019	Poliedro de Caracas, Caracas	Venezuela	60	
2020	8th	United States	March 27, 2021	Show DC Hall, Bangkok (Note: In 2020, the contest was scheduled to be hosted in Venezuela for the second time, but was canceled due to the impact of the COVID-19 pandemic, so the contest location moved to Thailand.)	Thailand	63	
2021	9th	Vietnam	December 4, 2021	Show DC Hall, Bangkok	Thailand	59	
2022	10th	Brazil	October 25, 2022	Sentul International Convention Center, West Java	Indonesia	68	
2023	11th	Peru	October 25, 2023	Phú Thọ Indoor Stadium, Ho Chi Minh City	Vietnam	69	
2024	12th	India (terminated)	October 25, 2024	MGI Hall, Bravo BKK Mall, Bangkok (Note: In 2024, the contest was scheduled to be hosted in Myanmar for the second time, but was canceled due to the impact of the Myanmar Civil War, so the contest location was moved to Cambodia, but then due to conflicts between the international organizing committee and the host, the contest location was finally moved to Thailand.) (Note: In 2026, the contest was scheduled to be hosted in India, but the hosting role was terminated after the host country failed to fulfill the contractual commitments and standards agreed upon with the international organizing committee. The contest was subsequently relocated to Thailand.)	Thailand	68	
2024	12th	Philippines (assumed)	October 25, 2024	MGI Hall, Bravo BKK Mall, Bangkok	Thailand	68	
2025	13th	Philippines	October 18, 2025	MGI Hall, Bravo BKK Mall, Bangkok	Thailand	77	
2026	14th	Tanzania	October 10, 2026	MGI Hall, Bravo BKK Mall, Bangkok	Thailand	77	
2027	15th	TBA	October, 2027	MGI Hall, Bravo BKK Mall, Bangkok	Thailand	TBA	

== Editions by host country or territory ==
This list includes the editions of Miss Grand International by host country or territory in ascending order.

Country/territory	Edition	Year
Thailand	9	2013–2015, 2020–2021, 2024–2027
Vietnam	2	2017, 2023
Indonesia	1	2022
Venezuela	1	2019
Myanmar	1	2018
United States	1	2016

== Editions by host cities ==
This map includes the host cities of the editions of Miss Grand International by year.

Miss Grand International host cities

== See also ==
- List of Miss Grand International titleholders
- List of Miss Grand International runners-up and finalists
