= List of Miss Grand International runners-up and finalists =

This article provides the names of the runners-up in the Miss Grand International pageant since the pageant's first edition in 2013.

== Table of Miss Grand International runner-up and finalists ==
Since 2013, Miss Grand International has started announcing awards for all four runner-up positions and the Miss Grand International titleholder. Originally, the pageant presented trophies solely to the contestants who ranked 1st runner-up through 4th runner-up, in addition to the winner. However, as of 2019, the organization began bestowing crowns upon all four of these positions. Additionally, in 2022, they introduced the new title of 5th runner-up for a top 10 finalists.

This table shows the finalists of each competition, from its inception in 2013.

Year	Miss Grand International (1st Place)	1st Runner-Up (2nd Place)	2nd Runner-Up (3rd Place)	3rd Runner-Up (4th Place)	4th Runner-Up (5th place)	Ref.
2013	Janelee Chaparro; Puerto Rico	Chantel Martínez; Dominican Republic	Denisa Pasečiaková; Slovakia	Annalie Forbes; Philippines	Kelly Louise Maguire; Australia	
2014	Lees Garcia; Cuba	~~Hiwot Mamo~~ (Dethroned); Ethiopia	Kathryn Kohut; Canada	Renera Thompson; Australia	Mónica Castaño; Colombia	
2015	~~Anea Garcia~~ (Dethroned); Dominican Republic	~~Claire Elizabeth Parker~~ (Note: In 2019, Claire Elizabeth Parker relinquished her title as Miss Grand International 2015 after participating in Miss Universe Australia 2019.) (Assumed)(Relinquished); Australia	Vartika Singh; India	Parul Shah; Philippines	Rattikorn Kunsom; Thailand	
2016	Ariska Putri Pertiwi; Indonesia	Nicole Cordoves; Philippines	Supaporn Malisorn; Thailand	Madison Anderson; Puerto Rico	Michelle Leon; United States	
2017	María José Lora; Peru	Tulia Alemán; Venezuela	Elizabeth Clenci; Philippines	Brenda Jiménez; Puerto Rico	Nikola Uhlířová; Czech Republic	
2018	Clara Sosa; Paraguay	Meenakshi Chaudhary; India	Nadia Purwoko; Indonesia	Nicole Colón; Puerto Rico	Haruka Oda; Japan	
2019	Valentina Figuera; Venezuela	María Malo; Mexico	Arayha Suparurk; Thailand	Carmen Drayton; Panama	Marjorie Marcelle; Brazil	
2020	Abena Appiah; United States	Samantha Bernardo; Philippines	Ivana Batchelor; Guatemala	Aurra Kharishma; Indonesia	Lala Guedes; Brazil	
2021	Nguyễn Thúc Thùy Tiên; Vietnam	Andrea Aguilera; Ecuador	Lorena Rodrigues; Brazil	Vivianie Diaz-Arroyo; Puerto Rico	Jeanè Van Dam; South Africa	
2022	Isabella Menin; Brazil	Engfa Waraha; Thailand	Andina Julie; Indonesia	Luiseth Materán; Venezuela	Mariana Bečková; Czech Republic	
2023	Luciana Fuster; Peru	Ni Ni Lin Eain; Myanmar	María Alejandra López; Colombia	Sthephanie Miranda; United States	Lê Hoàng Phương; Vietnam	
2024	~~Rachel Gupta~~ (Dethroned); India	Christine Juliane Opiaza; Philippines	~~Thae Su Nyein~~ (Dethroned); Myanmar	~~Safiétou Kabengele~~ (Resigned); France	Talita Hartmann; Brazil	
2024	Christine Juliane Opiaza (Assumed); Philippines	Talita Hartmann (Assumed); Brazil	Amy Viranya Berry (Assumed); United Kingdom	Susana Medina (Assumed); Spain	María Felix (Assumed); Dominican Republic	
2025	Emma Tiglao; Philippines	Sarunrat Puagpipat; Thailand	Aitana Jiménez; Spain	Faith Maria Porter; Ghana	Nariman Battikha; Venezuela	
2026	Jihan Dimack; Tanzania	Shyare Andrade; Ecuador	Beau Megan Goos; Netherlands	Ximena Carrillo; Guatemala	Emoura Phạm; Vietnam	

=== 5th runner-up ===
Since 2022, Miss Grand International pageant has awarded a top 10 finalists as 5th runner-up.

This table lists the name of 5th runner-up titles by year.

Year	5th Runner-Up (6th Place)						Ref.
2022	~~Pich Votey Saravody~~ (Dethroned); Cambodia	Priscilla Londoño; Colombia	Roberta Tamondong (Assumed); Philippines	Oxana Rivera; Puerto Rico	Hirisley Jiménez; Spain		
2022	~~Pich Votey Saravody~~ (Dethroned); Cambodia	Priscilla Londoño; Colombia	~~Yuvna Rinishta~~ (Resigned); Mauritius	Oxana Rivera; Puerto Rico	Hirisley Jiménez; Spain		
2023	Eugénia das Neves; Angola	Skarxi Marte; Dominican Republic	Ritassya Wellgreat; Indonesia	Melissa Bottema; Netherlands	Thaweeporn Phingchamrat; Thailand		
2024	María Angelica Valero (Assumed); Colombia	Akisha Albert (Assumed); Curaçao	Nova Liana; Indonesia	Melisha Lin (Assumed); Malaysia	Arlette Rujel; Peru		
2024	~~María Felix~~ (Promoted); Dominican Republic	~~Susana Medina~~ (Promoted); Spain	Nova Liana; Indonesia	~~Amy Viranya Berry~~ (Promoted); United Kingdom	Arlette Rujel; Peru		
2025	Laura Ramos; Colombia	Markéta Mörwicková; Czech Republic	Ana-Sofía Lendl; Guatemala	Monserrat Villalva; Mexico	Beatrice Alex; Tanzania		
2026	Marlène Kouassi; Côte d'Ivoire	Alyanni Gómez; Cuba	Pety Juárez; Mexico	Vicky Carbonell; Puerto Rico	Patthama Jitsawat; Thailand	Lady Di Mosquera; Venezuela	

== Countries/Territories by number of finalists ==
=== 1st runner-up ===
The first runner-up of each edition of Miss Grand International is the second placer behind the candidate who is crowned as Miss Grand International (first placer). In some cases, she shall take over the title of Miss Grand International, if:

- The outgoing titleholder cannot fulfill her duties. This could happen and may result to resignation, giving up the title, or dethronement
- The titleholder is dethroned due to deeds that violate the organization's policies. This has happened in 2015 and 2024.

The second-place finisher being designated as 1st runner-up has been awarded twelve times (2013–2024).

This table lists the number of 1st runner-up titles by country. There are some special considerations:

- As Ethiopia was dethroned from the 1st runner-up position in 2014, it is unknown if the position was taken by another candidate.
- After Australia took over the Miss Grand International title in 2015, but subsequently relinquished the title in 2019, it remains uncertain whether another candidate secured the 1st runner-up position after the succession took place.
- Philippines took over the Miss Grand International title of 2024 after Rachel Gupta was dethroned.
- In 2024, due to several resignations and dethronements, the organization proceeded with a full realignment of the finalist placements, which led to the promotion of Talita Hartmann from Brazil from 4th runner-up to 1st runner-up.

The current 1st runner-up is Shyare Andrade from Ecuador.

Country or territory	Titles	Years
Ecuador	2	2021, 2026
Thailand	2	2022, 2025
Philippines	2	2016, 2020
Brazil	1	2024
Myanmar	1	2023
Mexico	1	2019
India	1	2018
Venezuela	1	2017
Dominican Republic	1	2013

Up position change

Country or territory	Titles	Years
Philippines	1	2024
Australia	1	2015

Continent or region	Titles	Years
Asia	1	2024
Oceania	1	2015

Dethroned wins

Country or territory	Titles	Years
Ethiopia	1	2014

Continent or region	Titles	Years
Africa	1	2014

=== 2nd runner-up ===
The second runner-up of each edition of Miss Grand International is the third placer behind the candidate who is crowned as Miss Grand International (first placer).

The third-place finisher being designated as 2nd runner-up has been awarded twelve times (2013–2024).

This table lists the number of 2nd runner-up titles by country. There are some special considerations:

- Myanmar was dethroned from the 2nd runner-up position in 2024 and was later replaced by Amy Viranya Berry from the United Kingdom after several resignations and dethronements.

The current 2nd runner-up is Beau Megan Goos from the Netherlands.

Country or territory	Titles	Years
Indonesia	2	2018, 2022
Thailand	2	2016, 2019
Netherlands	1	2026
Spain	1	2025
United Kingdom	1	2024
Colombia	1	2023
Brazil	1	2021
Guatemala	1	2020
Philippines	1	2017
India	1	2015
Canada	1	2014
Slovakia	1	2013

Dethroned wins

Country or territory	Titles	Years
Myanmar	1	2024

Continent or region	Titles	Years
Asia	1	2024

=== 3rd runner-up ===
The third runner-up of each edition of Miss Grand International is the fourth placer behind the candidate who is crowned as Miss Grand International (first placer).

The fourth-place finisher being designated as 3rd runner-up has been awarded twelve times (2013–2024).

This table lists the number of 3rd runner-up titles by country. There are some special considerations:

- France resigned from the 3rd runner-up position in 2024 and was later replaced by Susana Medina from Spain after several resignations and dethronements.

The current 3rd runner-up is Ximena Carrillo from Guatemala.

Country or territory	Titles	Years
Puerto Rico	4	2016, 2017, 2018, 2021
Philippines	2	2013, 2015
Guatemala	1	2026
Ghana	1	2025
Spain	1	2024
United States	1	2023
Venezuela	1	2022
Indonesia	1	2020
Panama	1	2019
Australia	1	2014

Dethroned wins

Country or territory	Titles	Years
France	1	2024

Continent or region	Titles	Years
Europe	1	2024

=== 4th runner-up ===
The fourth runner-up of each edition of Miss Grand International is the fifth placer behind the candidate who is crowned as Miss Grand International (first placer).

The fifth-place finisher being designated as 4th runner-up has been awarded twelve times (2013–2024).

This table lists the number of 4th runner-up titles by country. There are some special considerations:

- In 2024, due to several resignations and dethronements, the organization proceeded with a full realignment of the finalist placements, which led to the promotion of María Felix from the Dominican Republic from 5th runner-up to 4th runner-up.

The current 4th runner-up is Emoura Phạm from Vietnam.

Country or territory	Titles	Years
Vietnam	2	2023, 2026
Czech Republic	2	2017, 2022
Brazil	2	2019, 2020
Venezuela	1	2025
Dominican Republic	1	2024
South Africa	1	2021
Japan	1	2018
United States	1	2016
Thailand	1	2015
Colombia	1	2014
Australia	1	2013

Up position change

Country or territory	Titles	Years
Brazil	1	2024

Continent or region	Titles	Years
Americas	1	2024

=== 5th runner-up ===
The fifth runner-up of each edition of Miss Grand International is the sixth placer behind the candidate who is crowned as Miss Grand International (first placer).

The sixth-place finisher being designated as 5th runner-up has been awarded three times (2022–2024).

This table lists the number of 5th runner-up titles by country. There are some special considerations:

- As Mauritius was dethroned from the 5th runner-up position in 2022, the position was taken by Philippines, who was originally placed as a top 20 finalists.
- In 2024, due to several resignations and dethronements, the organization proceeded with a full realignment of the finalist placements, which led to the promotion of María Angelica Valero from Colombia, Akisha Albert from Curaçao and Melisha Lin from Malaysia from Top 20 to 5th runners-up.

The current 5th runners-up are Marlène Kouassi from Côte d'Ivoire, Alyanni Gómez from Cuba, Pety Juárez from Mexico, Vicky Carbonell from Puerto Rico, Patthama Jitsawat from Thailand and Lady Di Mosquera from Venezuela.

Country or territory	Titles	Years
Colombia	3	2022, 2024, 2025
Mexico	2	2025, 2026
Thailand	2	2023, 2026
Puerto Rico	2	2022, 2026
Indonesia	2	2023, 2024
Côte d'Ivoire	1	2026
Cuba	1	2026
Venezuela	1	2026
Czech Republic	1	2025
Guatemala	1	2025
Tanzania	1	2025
Curaçao	1	2024
Malaysia	1	2024
Peru	1	2024
Angola	1	2023
Dominican Republic	1	2023
Netherlands	1	2023
Philippines	1	2022
Spain	1	2022

Up position change

Country or territory	Titles	Years
Dominican Republic	1	2024
Spain	1	2024
United Kingdom	1	2024

Continent or region	Titles	Years
Europe	2	2024
Asia	1	2024

Assumed wins

Titles assumed following dethronements.

Country or territory	Titles	Years
Philippines	1	2022

Continent or region	Titles	Years
Asia	1	2022

Dethroned wins

Country or territory	Titles	Years
Cambodia	1	2022
Mauritius	1	2022

Continent or region	Titles	Years
Asia	1	2022
Africa	1	2022

== Miss Grand International runners-up and finalists table position ==
This table shows the Miss Grand International runners-up and finalists rankings by country or territory from 2013 to the present.

Country/Territory	Total	Winner	Runners-up				
Country/Territory	Total	Winner	First	Second	Third	Fourth	Fifth
Philippines	8	2 (2024, 2025)	2 (2016, 2020, ~~2024~~)	1 (2017)	2 (2013, 2015)	×	1 (2022)
Peru	3	2 (2017, 2023)	×	×	×	×	1 (2024)
Brazil	5	1 (2022)	1 (2024)	1 (2021)	×	2 (2019, 2020, ~~2024~~)	×
Venezuela	5	1 (2019)	1 (2017)	×	1 (2022)	1 (2025)	1 (2026)
Indonesia	6	1 (2016)	×	2 (2018, 2022)	1 (2020)	×	2 (2023, 2024)
Puerto Rico	7	1 (2013)	×	×	4 (2016, 2017, 2018, 2021)	×	2 (2022, 2026)
United States	3	1 (2020)	×	×	1 (2023)	1 (2016)	×
Australia	3	1 (2015)	× (~~2015~~)	×	1 (2014)	1 (2013)	×
Vietnam	3	1 (2021)	×	×	×	2 (2023, 2026)	×
Tanzania	2	1 (2026)	×	×	×	×	1 (2025)
Cuba	2	1 (2014)	×	×	×	×	1 (2026)
Paraguay	1	1 (2018)	×	×	×	×	×
India	3	x (~~2024~~ (Note: Despite the dethronement of the Miss Grand International title, the placement is still taken into account statistically.))	1 (2018)	1 (2015)	×	×	×
Dominican Republic	4	× (~~2015~~)	1 (2013)	×	×	1 (2024)	1 (2023, ~~2024~~)
Thailand	7	×	2 (2022, 2025)	2 (2016, 2019)	×	1 (2015)	2 (2023, 2026)
Ecuador	2	×	2 (2021, 2026)	×	×	×	×
Myanmar	2	×	1 (2023)	× (~~2024~~)	×	×	×
Mexico	3	×	1 (2019)	×	×	×	2 (2025, 2026)
Ethiopia	1	×	× (~~2014~~ (Note: Despite the dethronement of the 1st runner-up in Miss Grand International, the placement is still taken into account statistically.))	×	×	×	×
Spain	3	×	×	1 (2025)	1 (2024)		1 (2022, ~~2024~~)
Guatemala	3	×	×	1 (2020)	1 (2026)	×	1 (2025)
Colombia	5	×	×	1 (2023)	×	1 (2014)	3 (2022, 2024, 2025)
Netherlands	2	×	×	1 (2026)	×	×	1 (2023)
United Kingdom	1	×	×	1 (2024)	×	×	× (~~2024~~)
Canada	1	×	×	1 (2014)	×	×	×
Slovakia	1	×	×	1 (2013)	×	×	×
Ghana	1	×	×	×	1 (2025)	×	×
Panama	1	×	×	×	1 (2019)	×	×
France	1	×	×	×	× (~~2024~~ (Note: Despite the resgination of the 3rd runner-up in Miss Grand International, the placement is still taken into account statistically.))	×	×
Czech Republic	3	×	×	×	x	2 (2017, 2022)	1 (2025)
South Africa	1	×	×	×	×	1 (2021)	×
Japan	1	×	×	×	×	1 (2018)	×
Côte d'Ivoire	1	×	×	×	×	×	1 (2026)
Curaçao	1	×	×	×	×	×	1 (2024)
Malaysia	1	×	×	×	×	×	1 (2024)
Angola	1	×	×	×	×	×	1 (2023)
Cambodia	1	×	×	×	×	×	× (~~2022~~ (Note: Despite the dethronement of the 5th runner-up in Miss Grand International, the placement is still taken into account statistically.))
Mauritius	1	×	×	×	×	×	× (~~2022~~)

== All-time ranking placement ==
Country/Territory	Total	Winner	Runners-up					Top	
Country/Territory	Total	Winner	First	Second	Third	Fourth	Fifth	10	20/21/22/25
Philippines	9	2 (2024, 2025)	2 (2016, 2020, ~~2024~~)	1 (2017)	2 (2013, 2015)	×	1 (2022)	×	1 (~~2022~~, 2026)
Peru	10	2 (2017, 2023)	×	×	×	×	1 (2024)	2 (2016, 2019)	5 (2014, 2018, 2020, 2022, 2026)
Brazil	11	1 (2022)	1 (2024)	1 (2021)	×	2 (2019, 2020, ~~2024~~)	×	2 (2013, 2015)	4 (2014, 2017, 2018, 2025)
Venezuela	11	1 (2019)	1 (2017)	×	1 (2022)	1 (2025)	1 (2026)	3 (2013, 2018, 2021)	3 (2014, 2015, 2016)
Indonesia	10	1 (2016)	×	2 (2018, 2022)	1 (2020)	×	2 (2023, 2024)	3 (2014, 2017, 2021)	1 (2025)
Puerto Rico	12	1 (2013)	×	×	4 (2016, 2017, 2018, 2021)	×	2 (2022, 2026)	2 (2019, 2020)	3 (2014, 2015, 2023)
Australia	8	1 (2015)	× (~~2015~~)	×	1 (2014)	1 (2013)	×	1 (2019)	4 (2016, 2017, 2018, 2021)
United States	7	1 (2020)	×	×	1 (2023)	1 (2016)	×	×	4 (2013, 2015, 2025, 2026)
Vietnam	9	1 (2021)	×	×	×	2 (2023, 2026)	×	3 (2017, 2018, 2019)	3 (2016, 2020, 2022)
Cuba	5	1 (2014)	×	×	×	×	1 (2026)	1 (2013)	2 (2016, 2018)
Tanzania	2	1 (2026)	×	×	×	×	1 (2025)	×	x
Paraguay	7	1 (2018)	×	×	×	×	×	×	6 (2017, 2019, 2022, 2024, 2025, 2026)
India	6	x ~~(2024)~~	1 (2018)	1 (2015)	×	×	×	×	3 (2017, 2021, 2023)
Dominican Republic	10	× (~~2015~~)	1 (2013)	×	×	1 (2024)	1 (2023, ~~2024~~)	1 (2018)	5 (2019, 2020, 2021, 2022, 2025)
Thailand	13	×	2 (2022, 2025)	2 (2016, 2019)	×	1 (2015)	2 (2023, 2026)	3 (2014, 2017, 2020)	3 (2013, 2018, 2024)
Ecuador	5	×	2 (2021, 2026)	×	×	×	×	1 (2019)	2 (2013, 2025)
Myanmar	5	×	1 (2023)	× (~~2024~~)	×	×	×	×	3 (2013, 2020, 2021)
Mexico	11	×	1 (2019)	×	×	×	2 (2025, 2026)	1 (2018)	7 (2014, 2015, 2016, 2017, 2020, 2022, 2024)
Ethiopia	1	×	× (~~2014~~)	×	×	×	×	×	×
Spain	10	×	×	1 (2025)	1 (2024)	×	1 (2022, ~~2024~~)	3 (2015, 2018, 2021)	4 (2016, 2019, 2023, 2026)
Guatemala	5	×	×	1 (2020)	1 (2026)	×	1 (2025)	×	2 (2019, 2024)
Colombia	8	×	×	1 (2023)	×	1 (2014)	3 (2022, 2024,2025)	×	3 (2013, 2019, 2021, ~~2024~~)
Netherlands	6	×	×	1 (2026)	×	×	1 (2023)	×	4 (2013, 2015, 2017, 2021)
United Kingdom	4	×	×	1 (2024)	×	×	× (~~2024~~)	×	3 (2014, 2022, 2025)
Canada	1	×	×	1 (2014)	×	×	×	×	×
Slovakia	1	×	×	1 (2013)	×	×	×	×	×
Panama	2	×	×	×	1 (2019)	×	×	×	1 (2020)
Ghana	1	×	×	×	1 (2025)	×	×	×	×
France	5	×	×	×	× (~~2024~~)	×	×	×	4 (2015, 2021, 2023, 2025)
Czech Republic	9	×	×	×	×	2 (2017, 2022)	1 (2025)	1 (2020)	5 (2015, 2019, 2023, 2026)
Japan	7	×	×	×	×	1 (2018)	×	1 (2015)	5 (2014, 2019, 2020, 2024, 2025)
South Africa	2	×	×	×	×	1 (2021)	×	×	1 (2019)
Malaysia	5	×	×	×	×	×	1 (2024)	1 (2020)	3 (2016, 2021, ~~2024~~, 2026)
Angola	3	×	×	×	×	×	1 (2023)	×	2 (2015, 2021)
Curaçao	2	×	×	×	×	×	1 (2024)	×	1 (2022, ~~2024~~)
Côte d'Ivoire	1	×	×	×	×	×	1 (2026)	×	×
Cambodia	3	×	×	×	×	×	× (~~2022~~	1 (2021)	1 (2020)
Mauritius	1	×	×	×	×	×	× (~~2022~~)	×	×
Costa Rica	6	×	×	×	×	×	×	2 (2015, 2021)	4 (2017, 2018, 2019, 2026)
Ukraine	5	×	×	×	×	×	×	2 (2016, 2017)	3 (2014, 2015, 2023)
Sri Lanka	4	×	×	×	×	×	×	2 (2013, 2015)	2 (2014, 2018)
Russia	3	×	×	×	×	×	×	1 (2014)	2 (2017, 2018)
Poland	2	×	×	×	×	×	×	1 (2014)	1 (2015)
Argentina	1	×	×	×	×	×	×	1 (2020)	×
South Sudan	1	×	×	×	×	×	×	1 (2017)	×
Bahamas	1	×	×	×	×	×	×	1 (2016)	×
Macao	1	×	×	×	×	×	×	1 (2016)	×
South Korea	1	×	×	×	×	×	×	1 (2016)	×
Haiti	1	×	×	×	×	×	×	1 (2014)	×
Latvia	1	×	×	×	×	×	×	1 (2013)	×
Nigeria	4	×	×	×	×	×	×	×	4 (2021, 2022, 2023, 2026)
China	3	×	×	×	×	×	×	×	3 (2013, 2017, 2026)
Honduras	3	×	×	×	×	×	×	×	3 (2022, 2023, 2026)
Laos	3	×	×	×	×	×	×	×	3 (2017, 2023, 2025)
Belgium	2	×	×	×	×	×	×	×	2 (2025, 2026)
Chile	2	×	×	×	×	×	×	×	2 (2019, 2026)
El Salvador	2	×	×	×	×	×	×	×	2 (2020, 2024)
Uruguay	1	×	×	×	×	×	×	×	1 (2026)
Martinique	1	×	×	×	×	×	×	×	1 (2025)
Zambia	1	×	×	×	×	×	×	×	1 (2025)
United States Virgin Islands	1	×	×	×	×	×	×	×	1 (2024)
Uzbekistan	1	×	×	×	×	×	×	×	1 (2023)
Denmark	1	×	×	×	×	×	×	×	1 (2022)
Germany	1	×	×	×	×	×	×	×	1 (2021)
England	1	×	×	×	×	×	×	×	1 (2020)
Kenya	1	×	×	×	×	×	×	×	1 (2020)
Ireland	1	×	×	×	×	×	×	×	1 (2019)
Kazakhstan	1	×	×	×	×	×	×	×	1 (2018)
New Zealand	1	×	×	×	×	×	×	×	1 (2018)
Sweden	1	×	×	×	×	×	×	×	1 (2018)
Jamaica	1	×	×	×	×	×	×	×	1 (2016)
Portugal	1	×	×	×	×	×	×	×	1 (2016)
Tahiti	1	×	×	×	×	×	×	×	1 (2016)
Wales	1	×	×	×	×	×	×	×	1 (2016)
Israel	1	×	×	×	×	×	×	×	1 (2014)
North Macedonia	1	×	×	×	×	×	×	×	1 (2013)
Pakistan	1	×	×	×	×	×	×	×	1 (2013)
Zimbabwe	1	×	×	×	×	×	×	×	1 (2013)

== Placements ==
295 candidates have qualified for the final Miss Grand International competition since its inaugural edition in 2013 until the last one held in 2026.

Country/Territory	Total	Placements	Participations
Thailand	13	2010s / - / / / Y / Y / Y / Y / Y / Y / Y; 2020s / Y / N / Y / Y / Y / Y / Y / TBD	14
Puerto Rico	12	2010s / - / / / Y / Y / Y / Y / Y / Y / Y; 2020s / Y / Y / Y / Y / N / N / Y / TBD	14
Mexico	11	2010s / - / / / N / Y / Y / Y / Y / Y / Y; 2020s / Y / N / Y / N / Y / Y / Y / TBD	14
Venezuela	11	2010s / - / / / Y / Y / Y / Y / Y / Y / Y; 2020s / N / Y / Y / N / N / Y / Y / TBD	14
Brazil	11	2010s / - / / / Y / Y / Y / N / Y / Y / Y; 2020s / Y / Y / Y / N / Y / Y / N / TBD	14
Spain	10	2010s / - / / / N / N / Y / Y / N / Y / Y; 2020s / N / Y / Y / Y / Y / Y / Y / TBD	14
Dominican Republic	10	2010s / - / / / Y / N / Y / N / N / Y / Y; 2020s / Y / Y / Y / Y / Y / Y / N / TBD	14
Indonesia	10	2010s / - / / / N / Y / N / Y / Y / Y / N; 2020s / Y / Y / Y / Y / Y / Y / N / TBD	14
Peru	10	2010s / - / / / N / Y / N / Y / Y / Y / Y; 2020s / Y / N / Y / Y / Y / N / Y / TBD	13
Philippines	9	2010s / - / / / Y / N / Y / Y / Y / N / N; 2020s / Y / N / Y / N / Y / Y / Y / TBD	14
Vietnam	9	2010s / - / / / N / N / N / Y / Y / Y / Y; 2020s / Y / Y / Y / Y / N / N / Y / TBD	14
Czech Republic	8	2010s / - / / / N / N / Y / N / Y / N / Y; 2020s / Y / N / Y / Y / N / Y / Y / TBD	14
Colombia	8	2010s / - / / / Y / Y / N / N / N / N / Y; 2020s / N / Y / Y / Y / Y / Y / N / TBD	14
Australia	8	2010s / - / / / Y / Y / Y / Y / Y / Y / Y; 2020s / N / Y / N / N / N / N / N / TBD	13
United States	7	2010s / - / / / Y / N / Y / Y / N / N / N; 2020s / Y / N / N / Y / N / Y / Y / TBD	14
Japan	7	2010s / - / / / N / Y / Y / N / N / Y / Y; 2020s / Y / N / N / N / Y / Y / N / TBD	14
Paraguay	7	2010s / - / / / N / N / N / N / Y / Y / Y; 2020s / N / N / Y / N / Y / Y / Y / TBD	13
Netherlands	6	2010s / - / / / Y / N / Y / N / Y / N / N; 2020s / N / Y / N / Y / N / N / Y / TBD	14
India	6	2010s / - / / / N / N / Y / N / Y / Y / N; 2020s / N / Y / N / Y / Y / N / N / TBD	14
Costa Rica	6	2010s / - / / / N / N / Y / N / Y / Y / Y; 2020s / N / Y / N / N / N / N / Y / TBD	12
Cuba	5	2010s / - / / / Y / Y / N / Y / N / Y / N; 2020s / N / N / N / N / N / N / Y / TBD	14
Malaysia	5	2010s / - / / / N / N / N / Y / N / N / N; 2020s / Y / Y / N / N / Y / N / Y / TBD	14
Myanmar	5	2010s / - / / / Y / N / N / N / N / N / N; 2020s / Y / Y / N / Y / Y / N / N / TBD	14
Ecuador	5	2010s / - / / / Y / N / N / N / N / N / Y; 2020s / N / Y / N / N / N / Y / Y / TBD	13
France	5	2010s / - / / / N / N / Y / N / N / N / N; 2020s / N / Y / N / Y / Y / Y / N / TBD	13
Guatemala	5	2010s / - / / / N / N / N / N / N / N / Y; 2020s / Y / N / N / N / Y / Y / Y / TBD	12
Ukraine	5	2010s / - / / / N / Y / Y / Y / Y / N / N; 2020s / N / N / N / Y / N / N / N / TBD	8
Nigeria	4	2010s / - / / / N / N / N / N / N / N / N; 2020s / N / Y / Y / Y / N / N / Y / TBD	12
Sri Lanka	4	2010s / - / / / Y / Y / Y / N / N / Y / N; 2020s / N / N / N / N / N / N / N / TBD	11
United Kingdom	4	2010s / - / / / N / Y / N / N / N / N / N; 2020s / N / N / Y / N / Y / Y / N / TBD	6
China	3	2010s / - / / / Y / N / N / N / Y / N / N; 2020s / N / N / N / N / N / N / Y / TBD	12
Russia	3	2010s / - / / / N / Y / N / N / Y / Y / N; 2020s / N / N / N / N / N / N / N / TBD	12
Laos	3	2010s / - / / / N / N / N / N / Y / N / N; 2020s / N / N / N / Y / N / Y / N / TBD	9
Cambodia	3	2010s / - / / / N / N / N / N / N / N / N; 2020s / Y / Y / Y / N / N / N / N / TBD	8
Honduras	3	2010s / - / / / N / N / N / N / N / N / N; 2020s / N / N / Y / Y / N / N / Y / TBD	7
Angola	3	2010s / - / / / N / N / Y / N / N / N / N; 2020s / N / Y / N / Y / N / N / N / TBD	6
Belgium	2	2010s / - / / / N / N / N / N / N / N / N; 2020s / N / N / N / N / N / Y / Y / TBD	12
South Africa	2	2010s / - / / / N / N / N / N / N / N / Y; 2020s / N / Y / N / N / N / N / N / TBD	12
Panama	2	2010s / - / / / N / N / N / N / N / N / Y; 2020s / Y / N / N / N / N / N / N / TBD	12
Chile	2	2010s / - / / / N / N / N / N / N / N / Y; 2020s / N / N / N / N / N / N / Y / TBD	10
El Salvador	2	2010s / - / / / N / N / N / N / N / N / N; 2020s / Y / N / N / N / Y / N / N / TBD	10
Poland	2	2010s / - / / / N / Y / Y / N / N / N / N; 2020s / N / N / N / N / N / N / N / TBD	10
Tanzania	2	2010s / - / / / N / N / N / N / N / N / N; 2020s / N / N / N / N / N / Y / Y / TBD	6
Curaçao	2	2010s / - / / / N / N / N / N / N / N / N; 2020s / N / N / Y / N / Y / N / N / TBD	5
Canada	1	2010s / - / / / N / Y / N / N / N / N / N; 2020s / N / N / N / N / N / N / N / TBD	14
South Korea	1	2010s / - / / / N / N / N / Y / N / N / N; 2020s / N / N / N / N / N / N / N / TBD	13
Portugal	1	2010s / - / / / N / N / N / Y / N / N / N; 2020s / N / N / N / N / N / N / N / TBD	12
Germany	1	2010s / - / / / N / N / N / N / N / N / N; 2020s / N / Y / N / N / N / N / N / TBD	11
Haiti	1	2010s / - / / / N / Y / N / N / N / N / N; 2020s / N / N / N / N / N / N / N / TBD	11
Argentina	1	2010s / - / / / N / N / N / N / N / N / N; 2020s / Y / N / N / N / N / N / N / TBD	10
Macao	1	2010s / - / / / N / N / N / Y / N / N / N; 2020s / N / N / N / N / N / N / N / TBD	10
Denmark	1	2010s / - / / / N / N / N / N / N / N / N; 2020s / N / N / Y / N / N / N / N / TBD	8
Sweden	1	2010s / - / / / N / N / N / N / N / Y / N; 2020s / N / N / N / N / N / N / N / TBD	8
New Zealand	1	2010s / - / / / N / N / N / N / N / Y / N; 2020s / N / N / N / N / N / N / N / TBD	8
Ghana	1	2010s / - / / / N / N / N / N / N / N / N; 2020s / N / N / N / N / N / Y / N / TBD	7
United States Virgin Islands	1	2010s / - / / / N / N / N / N / N / N / N; 2020s / N / N / N / N / Y / N / N / TBD	7
Jamaica	1	2010s / - / / / N / N / N / Y / N / N / N; 2020s / N / N / N / N / N / N / N / TBD	7
Slovakia	1	2010s / - / / / Y / N / N / N / N / N / N; 2020s / N / N / N / N / N / N / N / TBD	7
Mauritius	1	2010s / - / / / N / N / N / N / N / N / N; 2020s / N / N / Y / N / N / N / N / TBD	6
England	1	2010s / - / / / N / N / N / N / N / N / N; 2020s / Y / N / N / N / N / N / N / TBD	6
Wales	1	2010s / - / / / N / N / N / Y / N / N / N; 2020s / N / N / N / N / N / N / N / TBD	6
Pakistan	1	2010s / - / / / Y / N / N / N / N / N / N; 2020s / N / N / N / N / N / N / N / TBD	6
Kazakhstan	1	2010s / - / / / N / N / N / N / N / Y / N; 2020s / N / N / N / N / N / N / N / TBD	5
South Sudan	1	2010s / - / / / N / N / N / N / Y / N / N; 2020s / N / N / N / N / N / N / N / TBD	5
Ethiopia	1	2010s / - / / / N / Y / N / N / N / N / N; 2020s / N / N / N / N / N / N / N / TBD	5
Ireland	1	2010s / - / / / N / N / N / N / N / N / Y; 2020s / N / N / N / N / N / N / N / TBD	4
Zimbabwe	1	2010s / - / / / Y / N / N / N / N / N / N; 2020s / N / N / N / N / N / N / N / TBD	4
Côte d'Ivoire	1	2010s / - / / / N / N / N / N / N / N / N; 2020s / N / N / N / N / N / N / Y / TBD	3
Uruguay	1	2010s / - / / / N / N / N / N / N / N / N; 2020s / N / N / N / N / N / N / Y / TBD	3
Kenya	1	2010s / - / / / N / N / N / N / N / N / N; 2020s / Y / N / N / N / N / N / N / TBD	3
North Macedonia	1	2010s / - / / / Y / N / N / N / N / N / N; 2020s / N / N / N / N / N / N / N / TBD	3
Latvia	1	2010s / - / / / Y / N / N / N / N / N / N; 2020s / N / N / N / N / N / N / N / TBD	3
Bahamas	1	2010s / - / / / N / N / N / Y / N / N / N; 2020s / N / N / N / N / N / N / N / TBD	2
Israel	1	2010s / - / / / N / Y / N / N / N / N / N; 2020s / N / N / N / N / N / N / N / TBD	2
Tahiti	1	2010s / - / / / N / N / N / Y / N / N / N; 2020s / N / N / N / N / N / N / N / TBD	2
Zambia	1	2010s / - / / / N / N / N / N / N / N / N; 2020s / N / N / N / N / N / Y / N / TBD	2
Martinique	1	2010s / - / / / N / N / N / N / N / N / N; 2020s / N / N / N / N / N / Y / N / TBD	1
Uzbekistan	1	2010s / - / / / N / N / N / N / N / N / N; 2020s / N / N / N / Y / N / N / N / TBD	1
Bolivia	0	2010s / - / / / N / N / N / N / N / N / N; 2020s / N / N / N / N / N / N / N / TBD	14
Nepal	0	2010s / - / / / N / N / N / N / N / N / N; 2020s / N / N / N / N / N / N / N / TBD	13
Egypt	0	2010s / - / / / N / N / N / N / N / N / N; 2020s / N / N / N / N / N / N / N / TBD	11
Hong Kong	0	2010s / - / / / N / N / N / N / N / N / N; 2020s / N / N / N / N / N / N / N / TBD	11
Italy	0	2010s / - / / / N / N / N / N / N / N / N; 2020s / N / N / N / N / N / N / N / TBD	11
Nicaragua	0	2010s / - / / / N / N / N / N / N / N / N; 2020s / N / N / N / N / N / N / N / TBD	11
Albania	0	2010s / - / / / N / N / N / N / N / N / N; 2020s / N / N / N / N / N / N / N / TBD	9
Kosovo	0	2010s / - / / / N / N / N / N / N / N / N; 2020s / N / N / N / N / N / N / N / TBD	8
Singapore	0	2010s / - / / / N / N / N / N / N / N / N; 2020s / N / N / N / N / N / N / N / TBD	8
Taiwan	0	2010s / - / / / N / N / N / N / N / N / N; 2020s / N / N / N / N / N / N / N / TBD	8
Romania	0	2010s / - / / / N / N / N / N / N / N / N; 2020s / N / N / N / N / N / N / N / TBD	7
Estonia	0	2010s / - / / / N / N / N / N / N / N / N; 2020s / N / N / N / N / N / N / N / TBD	7
Lebanon	0	2010s / - / / / N / N / N / N / N / N / N; 2020s / N / N / N / N / N / N / N / TBD	6
Mongolia	0	2010s / - / / / N / N / N / N / N / N / N; 2020s / N / N / N / N / N / N / N / TBD	6
Norway	0	2010s / - / / / N / N / N / N / N / N / N; 2020s / N / N / N / N / N / N / N / TBD	6
Belarus	0	2010s / - / / / N / N / N / N / N / N / N; 2020s / N / N / N / N / N / N / N / TBD	6
Hungary	0	2010s / - / / / N / N / N / N / N / N / N; 2020s / N / N / N / N / N / N / N / TBD	6
Armenia	0	2010s / - / / / N / N / N / N / N / N / N; 2020s / N / N / N / N / N / N / N / TBD	5
Malta	0	2010s / - / / / N / N / N / N / N / N / N; 2020s / N / N / N / N / N / N / N / TBD	5
Moldova	0	2010s / - / / / N / N / N / N / N / N / N; 2020s / N / N / N / N / N / N / N / TBD	5
Turkey	0	2010s / - / / / N / N / N / N / N / N / N; 2020s / N / N / N / N / N / N / N / TBD	5
Bulgaria	0	2010s / - / / / N / N / N / N / N / N / N; 2020s / N / N / N / N / N / N / N / TBD	5
Finland	0	2010s / - / / / N / N / N / N / N / N / N; 2020s / N / N / N / N / N / N / N / TBD	5
Scotland	0	2010s / - / / / N / N / N / N / N / N / N; 2020s / N / N / N / N / N / N / N / TBD	5
Bangladesh	0	2010s / - / / / N / N / N / N / N / N / N; 2020s / N / N / N / N / N / N / N / TBD	4
Iran	0	2010s / - / / / N / N / N / N / N / N / N; 2020s / N / N / N / N / N / N / N / TBD	4
Guadeloupe	0	2010s / - / / / N / N / N / N / N / N / N; 2020s / N / N / N / N / N / N / N / TBD	4
Suriname	0	2010s / - / / / N / N / N / N / N / N / N; 2020s / N / N / N / N / N / N / N / TBD	4
Switzerland	0	2010s / - / / / N / N / N / N / N / N / N; 2020s / N / N / N / N / N / N / N / TBD	4
Uganda	0	2010s / - / / / N / N / N / N / N / N / N; 2020s / N / N / N / N / N / N / N / TBD	4
Georgia	0	2010s / - / / / N / N / N / N / N / N / N; 2020s / N / N / N / N / N / N / N / TBD	3
Guyana	0	2010s / - / / / N / N / N / N / N / N / N; 2020s / N / N / N / N / N / N / N / TBD	3
Sierra Leone	0	2010s / - / / / N / N / N / N / N / N / N; 2020s / N / N / N / N / N / N / N / TBD	3
Greece	0	2010s / - / / / N / N / N / N / N / N / N; 2020s / N / N / N / N / N / N / N / TBD	3
Trinidad and Tobago	0	2010s / - / / / N / N / N / N / N / N / N; 2020s / N / N / N / N / N / N / N / TBD	3
Montenegro	0	2010s / - / / / N / N / N / N / N / N / N; 2020s / N / N / N / N / N / N / N / TBD	2
Bashkortostan	0	2010s / - / / / N / N / N / N / N / N / N; 2020s / N / N / N / N / N / N / N / TBD	2
Cameroon	0	2010s / - / / / N / N / N / N / N / N / N; 2020s / N / N / N / N / N / N / N / TBD	2
Crimea	0	2010s / - / / / N / N / N / N / N / N / N; 2020s / N / N / N / N / N / N / N / TBD	2
Gibraltar	0	2010s / - / / / N / N / N / N / N / N / N; 2020s / N / N / N / N / N / N / N / TBD	2
Lithuania	0	2010s / - / / / N / N / N / N / N / N / N; 2020s / N / N / N / N / N / N / N / TBD	2
Namibia	0	2010s / - / / / N / N / N / N / N / N / N; 2020s / N / N / N / N / N / N / N / TBD	2
Serbia	0	2010s / - / / / N / N / N / N / N / N / N; 2020s / N / N / N / N / N / N / N / TBD	2
Tatarstan	0	2010s / - / / / N / N / N / N / N / N / N; 2020s / N / N / N / N / N / N / N / TBD	2
Algeria	0	2010s / - / / / N / N / N / N / N / N / N; 2020s / N / N / N / N / N / N / N / TBD	1
Aruba	0	2010s / - / / / N / N / N / N / N / N / N; 2020s / N / N / N / N / N / N / N / TBD	1
Bonaire	0	2010s / - / / / N / N / N / N / N / N / N; 2020s / N / N / N / N / N / N / N / TBD	1
Bosnia and Herzegovina	0	2010s / - / / / N / N / N / N / N / N / N; 2020s / N / N / N / N / N / N / N / TBD	1
Botswana	0	2010s / - / / / N / N / N / N / N / N / N; 2020s / N / N / N / N / N / N / N / TBD	1
Cape Verde	0	2010s / - / / / N / N / N / N / N / N / N; 2020s / N / N / N / N / N / N / N / TBD	1
Cook Islands	0	2010s / - / / / N / N / N / N / N / N / N; 2020s / N / N / N / N / N / N / N / TBD	1
Fiji	0	2010s / - / / / N / N / N / N / N / N / N; 2020s / N / N / N / N / N / N / N / TBD	1
Greenland	0	2010s / - / / / N / N / N / N / N / N / N; 2020s / N / N / N / N / N / N / N / TBD	1
Guam	0	2010s / - / / / N / N / N / N / N / N / N; 2020s / N / N / N / N / N / N / N / TBD	1
Guinea	0	2010s / - / / / N / N / N / N / N / N / N; 2020s / N / N / N / N / N / N / N / TBD	1
Iceland	0	2010s / - / / / N / N / N / N / N / N / N; 2020s / N / N / N / N / N / N / N / TBD	1
Iraq	0	2010s / - / / / N / N / N / N / N / N / N; 2020s / N / N / N / N / N / N / N / TBD	1
Kurdistan	0	2010s / - / / / N / N / N / N / N / N / N; 2020s / N / N / N / N / N / N / N / TBD	1
Kyrgyzstan	0	2010s / - / / / N / N / N / N / N / N / N; 2020s / N / N / N / N / N / N / N / TBD	1
Liberia	0	2010s / - / / / N / N / N / N / N / N / N; 2020s / N / N / N / N / N / N / N / TBD	1
Luxembourg	0	2010s / - / / / N / N / N / N / N / N / N; 2020s / N / N / N / N / N / N / N / TBD	1
Mozambique	0	2010s / - / / / N / N / N / N / N / N / N; 2020s / N / N / N / N / N / N / N / TBD	1
Northern Ireland	0	2010s / - / / / N / N / N / N / N / N / N; 2020s / N / N / N / N / N / N / N / TBD	1
Palestine	0	2010s / - / / / N / N / N / N / N / N / N; 2020s / N / N / N / N / N / N / N / TBD	1
Réunion	0	2010s / - / / / N / N / N / N / N / N / N; 2020s / N / N / N / N / N / N / N / TBD	1
Rwanda	0	2010s / - / / / N / N / N / N / N / N / N; 2020s / N / N / N / N / N / N / N / TBD	1
Saint Vincent and the Grenadines	0	2010s / - / / / N / N / N / N / N / N / N; 2020s / N / N / N / N / N / N / N / TBD	1
Samoa	0	2010s / - / / / N / N / N / N / N / N / N; 2020s / N / N / N / N / N / N / N / TBD	1
Seychelles	0	2010s / - / / / N / N / N / N / N / N / N; 2020s / N / N / N / N / N / N / N / TBD	1
Siberia	0	2010s / - / / / N / N / N / N / N / N / N; 2020s / N / N / N / N / N / N / N / TBD	1
Tonga	0	2010s / - / / / N / N / N / N / N / N / N; 2020s / N / N / N / N / N / N / N / TBD	1
Tunisia	0	2010s / - / / / N / N / N / N / N / N / N; 2020s / N / N / N / N / N / N / N / TBD	1
Turkmenistan	0	2010s / - / / / N / N / N / N / N / N / N; 2020s / N / N / N / N / N / N / N / TBD	1

== Placement streaks ==
35 countries or territories have qualified consecutively for the final of Miss Grand International competition since its inaugural edition in 2013 until the last one held in 2026.

Country/Territory	Quantity	Consecutive placements
Puerto Rico	11	2013–2023
Thailand	8	2013–2020
Thailand	5	2022–present
Dominican Republic	8	2018–2025
Vietnam	8	2016–2023
Mexico	7	2014–2020
Mexico	3	2024–present
Venezuela	7	2013–2019
Venezuela	2	2025–present
Venezuela	2	2021–2022
Australia	7	2013–2019
Spain	6	2021–present
Spain	2	2018–2019
Spain	2	2015–2016
Brazil	6	2017–2022
Brazil	3	2013–2015
Brazil	2	2024–2025
Indonesia	6	2020–2025
Indonesia	3	2016–2018
Colombia	5	2021–2025
Colombia	2	2013–2014
Peru	5	2016-2020
Peru	3	2022–2024
Ukraine	4	2014–2017
Paraguay	3	2024–present
Paraguay	3	2017–2019
Philippines	3	2024–present
Philippines	3	2015–2017
Guatemala	3	2024–present
Guatemala	2	2019–2020
France	3	2023–2025
Nigeria	3	2021–2023
Cambodia	3	2020–2022
Costa Rica	3	2017–2019
Sri Lanka	3	2013–2015
Czech Republic	2	2025–present
Czech Republic	2	2022–2023
Czech Republic	2	2019–2020
Japan	2	2024–2025
Japan	2	2018–2019
Japan	2	2014–2015
United States	2	2025–present
United States	2	2015–2016
Myanmar	2	2023–2024
Myanmar	2	2020–2021
Belgium	2	2025–present
Ecuador	2	2025–present
Tanzania	2	2025–present
United Kingdom	2	2024–2025
India	2	2023–2024
Honduras	2	2023–2024
Malaysia	2	2020–2021
Poland	2	2014–2015
Cuba	2	2013–2014

== See also ==
- List of Miss Grand International titleholders
