= Miss Grand India 2025 =

3rd Miss Grand India pageant

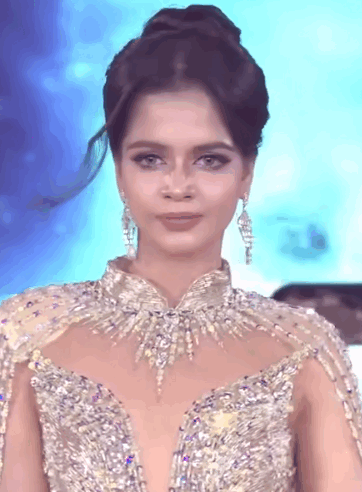
- Vishakha Kanwa
- Date: July 13, 2025
- Presenters: Sakul Limpapanon
- Venue: Zee Studion, Jaipur, Rajasthan
- Broadcaster: Grand TV
- Entrants: 29
- Placements: 12
- Debuts: Andhra Pradesh; Arunachal Pradesh; Indian diaspora in Canada; Mizoram; Sikkim; Tripura
- Winner: Vishakha Kanwar (Rajasthan)
- Photogenic: Manya Chandra (Delhi)

External videos
- Grand final competition

Miss Grand India 2025 was the 3rd Miss Grand India pageant, held on 13 July 2025 at the Zee Studion in Jaipur, Rajasthan. Twenty-nine candidates from different states and union territories of India competed for the right to represent the country in the parent tournament, Miss Grand International 2025.

The contest was won by Vishakha Kanwar of Rajasthan, making her eligible to represent India internationally in the parent stage, to be held in Bangkok, Thailand on 18 October 2025. Meanwhile, the first runner-up, Vanlalnuntluangi, was set to compete at Miss Eco International pageant.

The pageant's preliminary and final rounds were also attended by Miss Grand International 2024 CJ Opiaza of the Philippines and Miss Grand International's president Nawat Itsaragrisil.

== Background ==
This edition was the first Miss Grand India under directorship of Akanksha Thakur of Star Entertainment Production. After obtaining the franchise, Star Entertainment Production allocated state-level competition licenses to independent organizers, who appointed their state representatives to participate at the national level. The 2025 edition marks the Tripura entries.

== Results ==
=== Main placements ===
Miss Grand India 2025 result by state
Color key:
Winner	Top 12
Runner-up	Unplaced
No representative

Position	Candidate	International placement
Miss Grand India 2025	#28 Rajasthan – Vishakha Kanwar	Unplaced – Miss Grand International 2025
1st Runner-Up	#27 Mizoram – Vanlalnuntluangi	
2nd Runner-Up	#13 Gujarat – Nandini Patel	
3rd Runner-Up	#26 Nagaland – Tsurila Jankhiungru	
4th Runner-Up	#25 Delhi – Tancy Renu Pal	
Top 12	#3 Telangana – Apoorva T; #5 Arunachal Pradesh – Gianga Ramching; #11 Delhi – Manya Chandra; #14 Madhya Pradesh – Nandini Sharma; #18 West Bengal – Reshmi Deokota; #21 Uttar Pradesh – Sanskriti Sharma; #22 Maharashtra – Shemonyl Wankadia	

=== Special awards ===
Awards	Candidate
Best in Interview	#26 Nagaland – Tsurila Jankhiungru
Best in Swimsuit	#27 Mizoram – Vanlalnuntluangi
Miss Social Media	#27 Mizoram – Vanlalnuntluangi

== Contestants ==
The following contestants have been confirmed.

State	Candidate
Arunachal Pradesh	Gianga Ramching
Assam I	Sweety Gayari
Assam II	Gitashree Deka
Bihar	Ritika Rani
Chhattisgarh	Lipee Meshram
Delhi I	Tancy Renu Pal
Delhi II	Manya Chandra
Gujarat	Nandini Patel
Indian diaspora in Canada	Anshu Singh
Jharkhand	Priyanshu Chaudhary
Karnataka I	Sahana Gunaki
Karnataka II	Khushi Tikare
Madhya Pradesh I	Nandini Sharma
Madhya Pradesh II	Kanak Bharti Goswami
Madhya Pradesh III	Neelam Vamankar
Maharashtra I	Shemonyl Wankadia
Maharashtra II	Alisha Pathan
Maharashtra III	Anaaya Gardner
Mizoram	Vanlalnuntluangi
Nagaland I	Kevilenuo Semou
Nagaland II	Tsurila Jankhiungru
Nagaland III	Phangmei Konyak
Rajasthan	Vishakha Kanwar
Sikkim	Sakshi Pradhan
Telangana	Apoorva T
Tripura	Prity Tripura
Uttar Pradesh I	Sanskriti Sharma
Uttar Pradesh II	Muskan Tyagi
West Bengal	Reshmi Deokota

Withdrawn candidates

- Assam – Aditi Rajkhowa (Guwahati)
- Delhi – Radhika Singhal
- Delhi – Khushi Verma
- Madhya Pradesh – Apoorva Sharma (Gwalior)
- Madhya Pradesh – Trasha Saxena (Bhopal)
- Indian diaspora in USA – Shriya Boppana (Herndon)
- Maharashtra – Nehha Mahesh Shinde (Pune)
- Tripura – Aarya Debbarma

== List of regional coordinators ==
The following is a list of the 2025 Miss Grand India regional licensees.

- Andhra Pradesh and Telangana – Ilahe Modeling & Finishing School (2)
- Arunachal Pradesh, Assam, Manipur, Meghalaya, Mizoram, Nagaland and Tripura – Jaijaiwanka Lamare (7)
- Bihar – School of Dreams modeling academy
- Karnataka – The Model Voice
- Madhya Pradesh – Beyond Infinity Talent Academy (BITA)
- Mumbai – PMT Model & Pageant Training Academy
- Rajasthan – Miss Rajasthan by Yogesh Mishra
- Sikkim – Sikkim Glamour World by David Rai
- Tamil Nadu – Southernwood Model Academy by Nayana Sai
- Uttarakhand – Sinmit Communication
