= Miss Grand India 2023 =

1st edition of the Miss Grand India beauty pageant

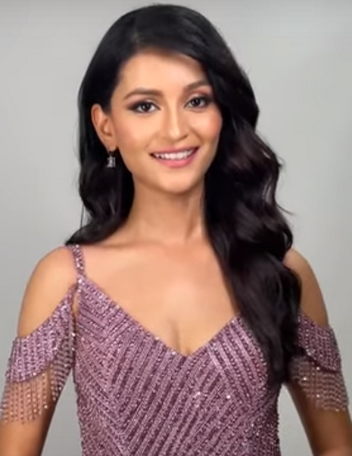
- Arshina Sumbul, the winner of the contest
- Date: September 19, 2023
- Presenters: Aayushi Dholakia; Wachi Pareek
- Venue: Rambagh Palace Hotel, Jaipur, Rajasthan
- Broadcaster: Bharat24; YouTube
- Entrants: 18
- Placements: 6
- Winner: Arshina Sumbul (Jaipur)
- Congeniality: Garima Singh (Jaipur)
- Photogenic: Sophiya Singh (New Delhi)
- Miss Tourism: Sophiya Singh (New Delhi)

External videos
- Glamanand Supermodel India - Miss Grand India 2023 Finale, on September 19, 2023, Youtube Video

Miss Grand India 2023 or GSI – Miss Grand India 2023, was the inaugural edition of the Miss Grand India pageant, held by the Glamanand Group on September 19, 2023, at the Rambagh Palace Hotel, Jaipur, Rajasthan. Eighteen candidates, who qualified for the national pageant through an online profile screening, competed for the title, of whom a 24-year-old model from the host city, Arshina Sumbul, was announced as the winner, while a businessperson from New Delhi, Sophhiya Sing, was named Miss Tourism India, and the vice-miss title was awarded to an Assamese clinical researcher, Rajashree Dowarah.

Arshina later represented India at the Miss Grand International 2023 pageant, held in Vietnam on October 25, 2023, while Sophhiya Sing was to compete at the Miss Tourism World 2023 held in November 2023.

The pageant grand final was hosted by Miss Teen International 2019 Aayushi Dholakia and Miss Teen Universe runner-up Wachi Pareek.

== Background ==
After Glamanand Group obtained the Miss Grand India license in 2020, the country representatives for Miss Grand International were usually determined through the Glamanand Supermodel India pageant, in which the main winners were sent to compete at Miss International in that particular year. Due to losing the license of Miss International for India to another organizer in early 2023, the Miss International India 2023 titleholder, Kashish Methwani, who obtained the title from the Glamanand Supermodel India 2022 contest, was assigned as the country representative for Miss Grand International 2023 instead; the appointment was officially declared on June 4.

However, according to an agreement between the Miss Grand International PLC and Glamanand Group regarding the selection process of the Indian representative for the Miss Grand International 2023 pageant, the procedure must be done via a national contest, which caused the appointed Kashish Methwani to be refused, and the Glamanand Group later organized the pageant in late September to elect the replacement.

== Result ==
Position	Delegate	International Placement
Miss Grand India 2023	04. Jaipur – Arshina Sumbul	Top 20 - Miss Grand International 2023
Miss Tourism India 2023	01. New Delhi – Sophiya Singh	Top 20 - Miss Asia Pacific International 2024
1st runner-up	18. Assam – Rajashree Dowarah	
Top 6	10. Mumbai – Shriya Parab; 16. Udaipur – Suhani Nenawa; 17. Jhansi – Puja Nagaria	
Special awards
Best Evening Gown	16. Udaipur – Suhani Nenawa	
Miss Top Model	16. Udaipur – Suhani Nenawa	
Best in Ramp Walk	16. Udaipur – Suhani Nenawa	
Beauty with Brains	15. Amritsar – Aarushi Sharma	
Beauty with Purposes	17. Jhansi – Puja Nagaria	
Best in Swimsuit	18. Assam – Rajashree Dowarah	
Best Body	13. Bangalore – Kaavya Nayar	
Beautiful Skin	04. Jaipur – Arshina Sumbul	
Best in Speech	08. Bikaner – Garima Singh	
Miss Congeniality	08. Bikaner – Garima Singh	
Miss Photogenic	01. Delhi – Sophiya Singh	

== Candidates ==
Eighteen candidates competed for the title of Miss Grand India.

1. Delhi – Sophiya Singh
2. Hyderabad – Aishwarya Paatapati
3. Mumbai – Shreya Verma
4. Jaipur – Arshina Sumbul
5. Hyderabad – Urmila Chauhan
6. Bhopal – Priya Rai
7. Jaipur – Tanu Chaudhary
8. Bikaner – Garima Singh
9. Mumbai – Prerna Singh
10. Mumbai – Shriya Parab
11. Nagpur – Srushti Ram
12. Delhi – Vioma Sharma
13. Bangalore – Kaavya Nayar
14. Shimla – Srishti Mehta
15. Amritsar – Aarushi Sharma
16. Udaipur – Suhani Nenawa
17. Jhansi – Puja Nagaria
18. Assam – Rajashree Dowarah
