= Miss Grand India 2024 =

2nd edition of the Miss Grand India beauty pageant

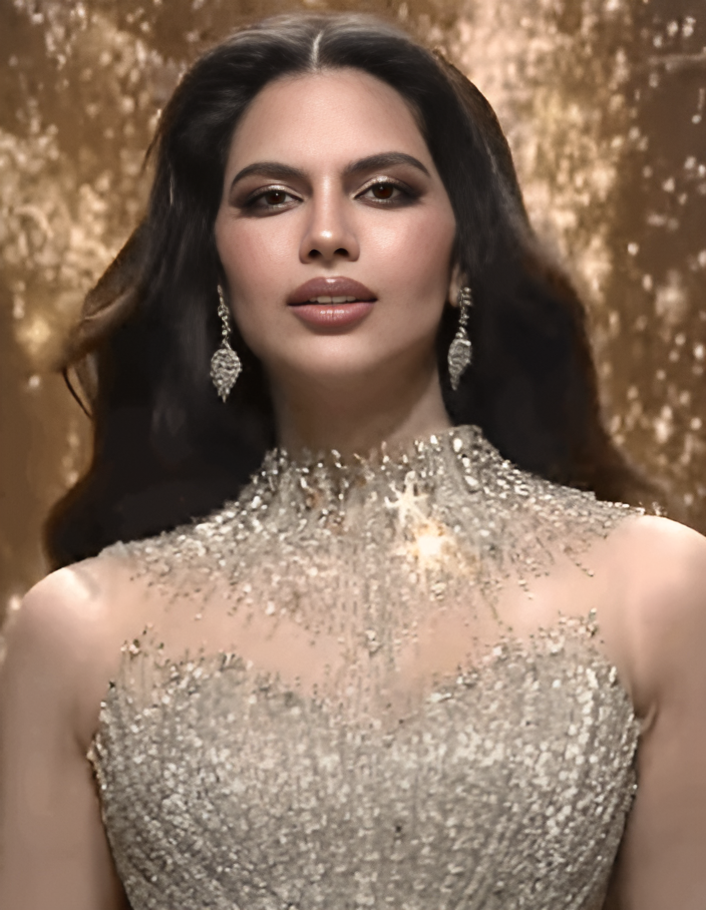
- Rachel Gupta, the winner of the contest
- Date: August 11, 2024
- Venue: Zee Studio, Jaipur
- Entrants: 22
- Placements: 12
- Winner: Rachel Gupta (Jalandhar)
- Best National Costume: Rachel Gupta (Jalandhar)

Miss Grand India 2024 or GSI – Miss Grand India 2024 was the second edition of the Miss Grand India pageant, held on August 11, 2024, at the Zee Studio, Jaipur. At the end of the event, Miss Grand India 2023 Arshina Sumbul of Jaipur crowned Rachel Gupta of Jalandhar as her successor. Rachel represented India at Miss Grand International 2024 , and won. She later resigned the title, becoming the first Indian to resign her title.

In addition to the main title, the country representatives for other 2024 international pageants, including Miss Cosmo, Miss Charm, and Miss Tourism World, were also determined.

== Selection of contestants ==
The contestants for Miss Grand India 2024 were determined through the state pageants and central audions organized by the national organizer. Only two states held the regional preliminary pageants for this year's edition, as detailed below.

Pageant	Title	Date	Venue	Entrant	Ref.
Audition	Miss Grand Meghalaya	Nov 14, 2023	No data available		
Miss Nagaland (Note: The pageant's main winner was assumed Miss Grand state titleholder.)	Miss Grand Nagaland	Dec 8, 2023	Capital Cultural Hall, Kohima	14	

== Final results ==
Color keys

- The contestant won in an international pageant.
- The contestant was a runner-up in an international pageant.
- The contestant was a semi-finalist in an international pageant.
- Unplaced

Final results	Candidate	International placement	Miss Grand India 2024 competition result by state of origin Color key: Miss Grand India winner Supplemental title winners: Runner-up / Top 8; Top 12 / Unplaced; Withdrew / No representative
Miss Grand India 2024	Punjab – Rachel Gupta	Winner – Miss Grand International 2024 (Note: Later dethroned/resigned.)	Miss Grand India 2024 competition result by state of origin Color key: Miss Grand India winner Supplemental title winners: Runner-up / Top 8; Top 12 / Unplaced; Withdrew / No representative
Miss Charm India 2024	Maharashtra – Shivangi Desai	Top 10 – Miss Charm 2024	Miss Grand India 2024 competition result by state of origin Color key: Miss Grand India winner Supplemental title winners: Runner-up / Top 8; Top 12 / Unplaced; Withdrew / No representative
Miss Cosmo India 2024	Assam – Rajashree Dowarah	Unplaced – Miss Cosmo 2024	Miss Grand India 2024 competition result by state of origin Color key: Miss Grand India winner Supplemental title winners: Runner-up / Top 8; Top 12 / Unplaced; Withdrew / No representative
Miss Tourism India 2024	Meghalaya – Irene Dkhar	Top 15 – Miss Tourism World 2024	Miss Grand India 2024 competition result by state of origin Color key: Miss Grand India winner Supplemental title winners: Runner-up / Top 8; Top 12 / Unplaced; Withdrew / No representative
Runner up	New Delhi – Palak Kohli		Miss Grand India 2024 competition result by state of origin Color key: Miss Grand India winner Supplemental title winners: Runner-up / Top 8; Top 12 / Unplaced; Withdrew / No representative
Top 8	Nagaland – Neiketuno Sechü; Maharashtra – Rashmi Shinde; Meghalaya – Tanvi Raksam Marak		Miss Grand India 2024 competition result by state of origin Color key: Miss Grand India winner Supplemental title winners: Runner-up / Top 8; Top 12 / Unplaced; Withdrew / No representative
Top 12	Maharashtra – Nehha Mahesh Shinde; Karnataka – Spoorthi Shetty; Punjab – Raisin Saini; Rajasthan – Yuvika Gehlot		Miss Grand India 2024 competition result by state of origin Color key: Miss Grand India winner Supplemental title winners: Runner-up / Top 8; Top 12 / Unplaced; Withdrew / No representative
Special awards			Miss Grand India 2024 competition result by state of origin Color key: Miss Grand India winner Supplemental title winners: Runner-up / Top 8; Top 12 / Unplaced; Withdrew / No representative
Miss Top Model	Punjab – Rachel Gupta		Miss Grand India 2024 competition result by state of origin Color key: Miss Grand India winner Supplemental title winners: Runner-up / Top 8; Top 12 / Unplaced; Withdrew / No representative
Best in Ramp Walk	Punjab – Rachel Gupta		Miss Grand India 2024 competition result by state of origin Color key: Miss Grand India winner Supplemental title winners: Runner-up / Top 8; Top 12 / Unplaced; Withdrew / No representative
Beauty with Purposes	Punjab – Rachel Gupta		Miss Grand India 2024 competition result by state of origin Color key: Miss Grand India winner Supplemental title winners: Runner-up / Top 8; Top 12 / Unplaced; Withdrew / No representative
Best National Costume	Punjab – Rachel Gupta		Miss Grand India 2024 competition result by state of origin Color key: Miss Grand India winner Supplemental title winners: Runner-up / Top 8; Top 12 / Unplaced; Withdrew / No representative
Miss Popular	Nagaland – Neiketuno Sechü		Miss Grand India 2024 competition result by state of origin Color key: Miss Grand India winner Supplemental title winners: Runner-up / Top 8; Top 12 / Unplaced; Withdrew / No representative
Best Evening Gown	Meghalaya – Irene Dkhar		Miss Grand India 2024 competition result by state of origin Color key: Miss Grand India winner Supplemental title winners: Runner-up / Top 8; Top 12 / Unplaced; Withdrew / No representative
Miss Fashion Icon	Assam – Rajashree Dowarah		Miss Grand India 2024 competition result by state of origin Color key: Miss Grand India winner Supplemental title winners: Runner-up / Top 8; Top 12 / Unplaced; Withdrew / No representative

== Candidates ==
Twenty-two contestants competed in Miss Grand India 2024.

Number	Candidate	Age	State	Placement	Ref.
1	Aditi Bhatnagar		Uttar Pradesh	Unplaced	
2	Anju Pandey	24	West Bengal	Unplaced	
3	Guneetinder Kaur Saini	25	Punjab	Unplaced	
4	Irene Dkhar	21	Meghalaya	Miss Tourism India 2024	
5	Kopal Mandloi	25	Madhya Pradesh	Unplaced	
6	Mamta Choudhary		Rajasthan	Unplaced	
7	Nehha Mahesh Shinde		Maharashtra	Top 12	
8	Neiketuno Sechü	19	Nagaland	Top 8	
9	Palak Kohli		New Delhi	1st Runner Up	
10	Rachel Gupta	20	Punjab	Miss Grand India 2024	
11	Raisin Saini		Punjab	Top 8	
12	Rajashree Dowarah	19	Assam	Miss Cosmo India 2024	
13	Rashmi Shinde	26	Maharashtra	Top 12	
14	Sandra Francis		Kerala	Unplaced	
15	Shivangi Desai	22	Maharashtra	Miss Charm India 2024	
16	Shraddha Singh Chouhan		Gujarat	Unplaced	
17	Shreya Bediya		Madhya Pradesh	Unplaced	
18	Shreya Raj		Kerala	Unplaced	
19	Spoorthi Shetty		Karnataka	Top 12	
20	Swati Shubham		Bihar	Unplaced	
21	Tanvi Raksam Marak	26	Meghalaya	Top 8	
22	Yuvika Gehlot		Rajasthan	Top 12	

Withdrawn candidates

- Anwesha Pati of Andhra Pradesh.
- Barbie Mishra of Maharashtra.
- Bhavana Bhanu of Andhra Pradesh.
- Shruti Raul of Maharashtra.
