= Prohibido salir =

- Theatrical release poster
- Directed by: Sandro Ventura
- Written by: Sandro Ventura
- Produced by: Adolfo Aguilar; Sandro Ventura
- Starring: Anahí de Cárdenas; Renzo Schuller; Merly Morello; Facundo Vásquez de Velasco
- Cinematography: Hugo Shinki
- Music by: Diego Berrocal; Alejandra Irribarren; Max Masías
- Production company: Big Bang Films
- Release date: September 14, 2023
- Running time: 100 minutes
- Country: Peru
- Language: Spanish

Prohibido salir (lit. 'Forbidden to go out') is a 2023 Peruvian comedy film written, directed and co-produced by Sandro Ventura. The film stars Anahí de Cárdenas, Renzo Schuller, Merly Morello and Facundo Vásquez de Velasco. It premiered on September 14, 2023, in Peruvian theaters.

== Synopsis ==
Bernabé and Carolina's marriage is in crisis so they decide to separate for just one day before the quarantine is issued. Bernabé decides to take refuge in the safest place he knows: his house. Carolina, who already believed him to be out of her life, will not only have to put up with his return but also live with her two children: Macarena and Marcelo, 15 and 12 years old respectively.

== Cast ==
The actors participating in this film are:

- Anahí de Cárdenas as Carolina
- Renzo Schuller as Bernabé
- Merly Morello as Macarena
- Facundo Vásquez de Velasco as Marcelo
- Diego Lombardi as Ítalo
- Laura Spoya as Vero
- Maju Mantilla as Alma
- Santiago Suárez as Augusto
- Luciana Fuster as Liliana
- Camucha Negrete as Sonia
- Fabiana Valcárcel as Nicole
- Fiorella Luna as Alessia
- David Carrillo as Paco
- Liz Navarro as Amparo
- Alejandra Saba as Psychiatrist
- Chiara Molina as Secretary
- Miguel Vargas as Police

== Production ==
Principal photography began on February 26, 2021, and ended on March 23 of the same year in Lima, Peru.
