= Miss Grand India =

Indian beauty pageant title

- Formation: 2023
- Type: Beauty pageant
- Headquarters: New Delhi
- Location: India
- Official language: English
- National director: Mohini Sharma
- Parent organization: Mrs. India Inc
- Affiliations: Miss Grand International; Universal Woman

Miss Grand India licensee timeline

Miss Grand India is a national beauty pageant that selects India's official representative to the Miss Grand International pageant.

India has been competing in Miss Grand International since 2013, achieving six placements to date. In 2024, Rachel Gupta was crowned Miss Grand International, marking India’s first-ever victory at the pageant.

== History ==
India has been sending representatives to Miss Grand International since 2013. Initially, from 2013 to 2014, the rights to select Indian delegates were held by the Atharva Group of Institutes, which organized the Indian princess pageant. During this period, one of the pageant's finalists represented India at Miss Grand International.

In 2015, the license was acquired by The Times Group, which organizes Femina Miss India. From 2015 to 2022, India's representatives for Miss Grand International were selected through the Femina Miss India competition. In 2023, the franchise was transferred to the Glamanand Group, which launched Miss Grand India as a standalone pageant.

India won its first Miss Grand International title in 2024, when Rachel Gupta was crowned on October 25, 2024, in Thailand. Rachel was the fourth representative sent by the Glamanand Group and the twelfth overall to represent India in the competition.

In December 2024, Star Entertainment Productions, led by Akanksha Thakur, acquired the national license for Miss Grand India.

Gallery

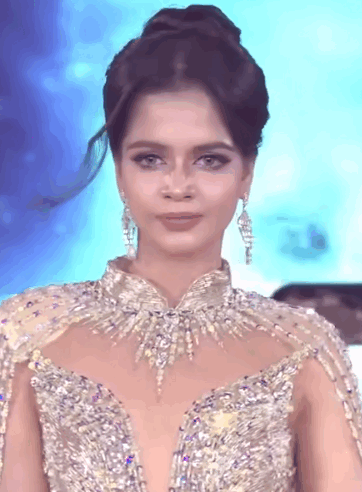
Vishakha Kanwa
Miss Grand India 2025

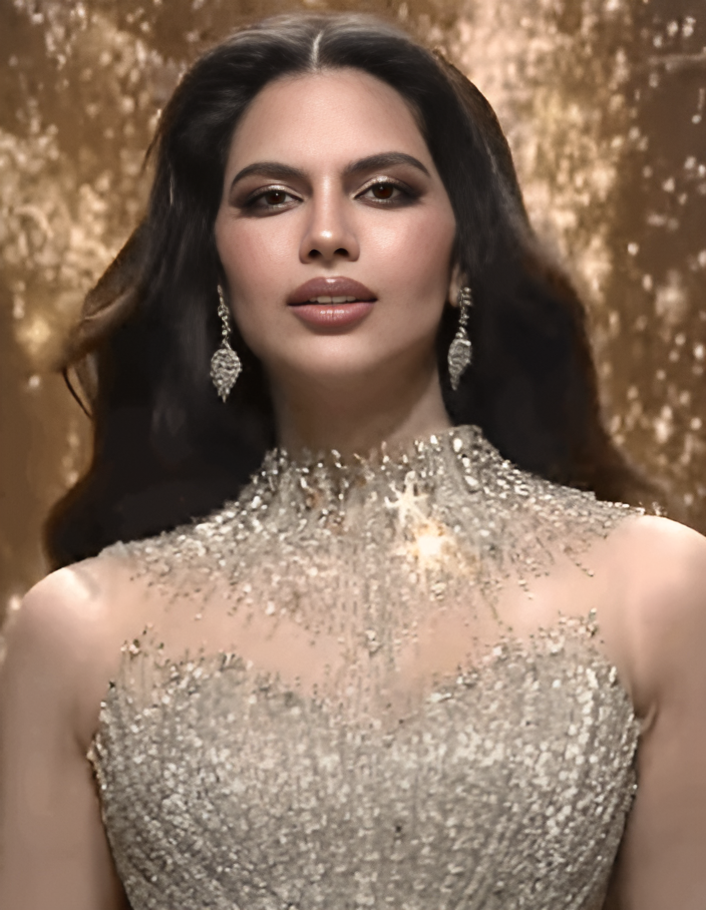
Rachel Gupta
Miss Grand India 2024

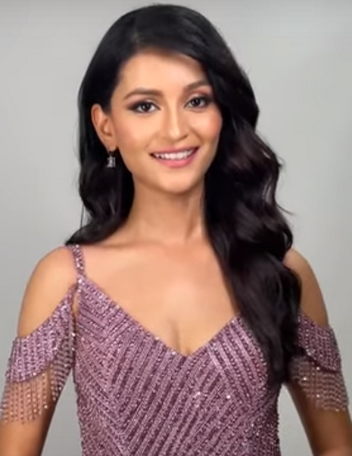
Arshina Sumbul
Miss Grand India 2023

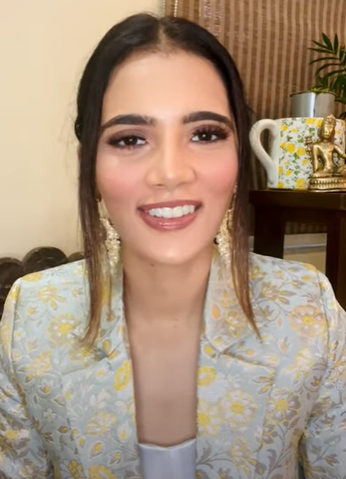
Praachi Nagpal
Miss Grand India 2022

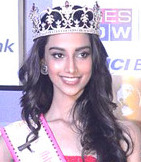
Meenakshi Chaudhary
Miss Grand India 2018

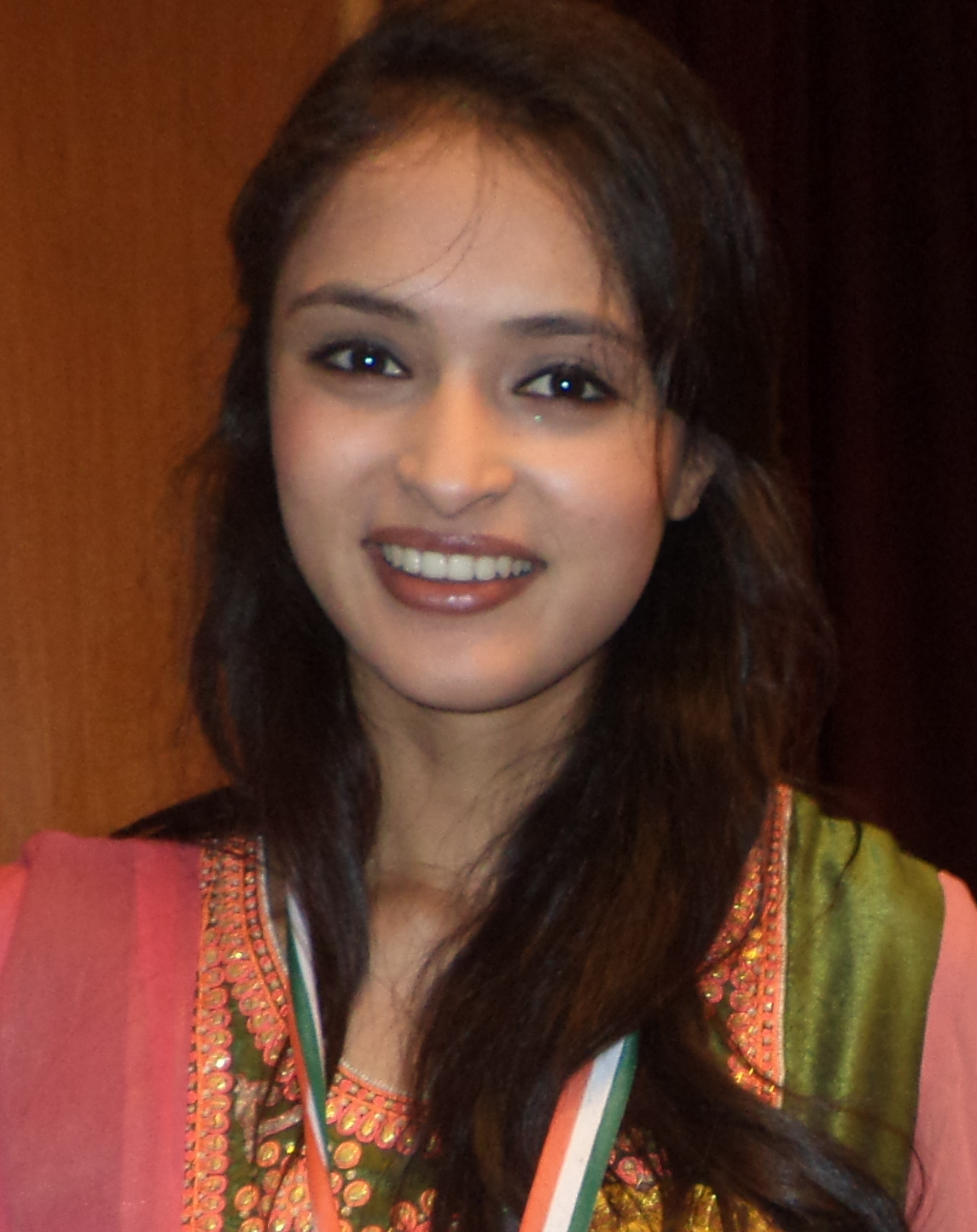
Anukriti Gusain
Miss Grand India 2017

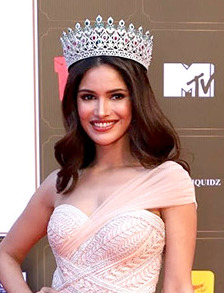
Vartika Singh
Miss Grand India 2015

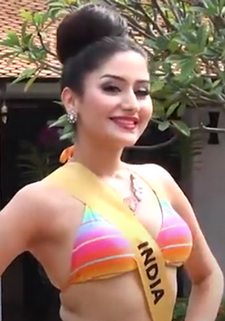
Monica Sharma
Miss Grand India 2014

== Editions ==
=== Location and date ===
The following are the details of the Miss Grand India editions, which have been held as a stand-alone pageant since 2023.

Edition	Date	Final venue	Entrants	Ref.
1st	19 September 2023	Rambagh Palace Hotel, Jaipur, Rajasthan	18	
2nd	11 August 2024	Zee Studion, Jaipur, Rajasthan	22	
3rd	13 June 2025	Zee Studion, Jaipur, Rajasthan	29	
4th	12 May 2026	Talkatora Stadium, New Delhi	29	

=== Competition result ===
Edition	Winner	Runners-up					Ref.
Edition	Winner	First	Second	Third	Fourth	Fifth	Ref.
1st	Arshina Sumbul (Jaipur)	Rajashree Dowarah (Assam)	Not awarded				
2nd	Rachel Gupta (Jaipur)	Palak Kohli (New Delhi)	Not awarded				
3rd	Vishakha Kanwar (Rajasthan)	Vanlalnunt Luangi (Mizoram)	Nandini Patel (Gujarat)	Tsurila Jankhiungru (Nagaland)	Tancy Renu Pal (Delhi)	Not awarded	
4th	Lakshita Thilagaraj (Tamil Nadu)	Mrigashree Baruah (Assam)	Tanvi Marak (Meghalaya)	Saanjh Khurana (Uttar Pradesh)	Reshmi Deokota (West Bengal)	Sneha Tamang (Sikkim)	

== International competition ==
- : Declared as Winner
- : Ended as runner-up or Top 5 qualification
- : Ended as one of the finalist/semi-finalist
- : Unplaced but given special award(s)

The following is a list of Indian representatives at the Miss Grand International contest.

Year	Delegate	State	National Title	Placement & Performance		Ref.
Year	Delegate	State	National Title	Placements	Special award(s)	Ref.
2013	Rupa Khurana	New Delhi	Finalist – Indian Princess 2014	Unplaced		
2014	Monica Sharma	New Delhi	Top 5 – Indian Princess 2014	Unplaced	1 Special Awards: Top 20 – Best National Costume	
2015	Vartika Singh	Uttar Pradesh	2nd Runner-Up – Femina Miss India 2015	2nd Runner-Up	3 Special Awards: Best in Social Media; Top 20 – Best National Costume; Top 10 – Highest Voting	
2016	Pankhuri Gidwani	Uttar Pradesh	2nd Runner-Up – Femina Miss India 2016	Unplaced	1 Special Awards: Top 10 – Best National Costume	
2017	Anukriti Gusain	Uttarakhand	Top 6 – Femina Miss India 2017	Top 20	2 Special Awards: Top 10 – Best National Costume; Top 10 – Best in Swimsuit	
2018	Meenakshi Choudhary	Haryana	Femina Miss Grand India 2018	1st Runner-Up	3 Special Awards: Top 10 – Miss Popular; Top 12 – Best National Costume; Top 10 – Pre-Arrival	
2019	Shivani Jadhav	Chhattisgarh	Femina Miss Grand India 2019	Unplaced	3 Special Awards: For Historic Crowns Fashion Show Gala; Top 10 – Miss Popular; Top 20 – Best National Costume	
2020	Simran Sharma	Rajasthan	Glamanand Supermodel Multinational 2018	Unplaced	1 Special Award: Top 15 – Queens with the Golden Crown	
2021	Manika Sheokand	Haryana	Femina Miss Grand India 2020	Top 20	2 Special Awards: Lottery Prizes Event (Judge's Choice); Top 20 – Pre-Arrival	
2022	Praachi Nagpal	Telangana	Miss Grand India 2022	Unplaced	3 Special Awards: Top 8 – Best National Costume; Top 10 – Pre-Arrival Voting; Top 10 – Country's Power of the Year challenge	
2023	Arshina Sumbul	Rajasthan	Miss Grand India 2023	Top 20	2 Special Awards: Top 20 – Best National Costume (Judges Choice); Top 20 – Country's Power of the Year challenge	
2024	Rachel Gupta	Punjab	Miss Grand India 2024	Miss Grand International 2024 (Note: Later Dethroned/Resigned)	5 Special Awards: Winner – Grand Pageant's Choice Award; Top 4 – Country's Power of the Year Challenge; Top 10 – Pre-Arrival Voting; Top 10 – Best in Swimsuit (Judge's Choice); Top 30 – Grand Voice Challenge	
2025	Vishakha Kanwar	Rajasthan	Miss Grand India 2025	Unplaced	1 Special Awards: Best National Costumes	
2026	Lakshita Thilagaraj	Tamil Nadu	Miss Grand India 2026	Unplaced		

== National pageant candidates ==
=== Participating regional and territories representatives ===
Editions Represented	1st	2nd	3rd	4th
States and union territories
Andaman and Nicobar Islands				Y
Andhra Pradesh		Y		Y
Andhra Pradesh		Y		Y
Arunachal Pradesh			12	15
Assam		MCO	Y	
Assam		MCO	Y	
Assam		MCO	Y	
Bihar		Y	Y	Y
Chandigarh				Y
Chhattisgarh			Y	Y
Dadra and Nagar Haveli and Daman and Diu				
Delhi	Y			15
Delhi	Y		12	15
Delhi	Y		Y	15
Delhi	Y		Y	15
Goa				
Gujarat		Y		15
Haryana				15
Himachal Pradesh				
Jammu and Kashmir				Y
Jharkhand			Y	Y
Karnataka		12	Y	Y
Karnataka		12	Y	Y
Kerala		Y		15
Kerala		Y		15
Ladakh				
Lakshadweep				Y
Madhya Pradesh		Y	12	
Madhya Pradesh		Y	Y	
Madhya Pradesh		Y	Y	
Madhya Pradesh		Y	Y	
Madhya Pradesh		Y	Y	
Maharashtra		MC	12	Y
Maharashtra		8	Y	Y
Maharashtra		12	Y	Y
Maharashtra		Y	Y	Y
Maharashtra		Y	Y	Y
Manipur				15
Meghalaya		MT		
Meghalaya		8		
Mizoram				
Nagaland		8		15
Nagaland		8	Y	15
Nagaland		8	Y	15
Odisha				
Puducherry				Y
Punjab				Y
Punjab		12		Y
Punjab		Y		Y
Rajasthan		12		15
Rajasthan		Y		15
Sikkim			Y	
Tamil Nadu				
Telangana			12	15
Tripura			Y	15
Tripura			Y	15
Uttar Pradesh		Y	12	
Uttar Pradesh		Y	Y	
Uttarakhand				Y
West Bengal		Y	12	
Capital and city
Amritsar	Y			
Bengaluru	Y			
Bhopal	Y			
Bikaner	Y			
Hyderabad	Y			
Hyderabad	Y			
Jaipur				
Jaipur	Y			
Jhansi	6			
Mumbai	6			
Mumbai	Y			
Mumbai	Y			
Nagpur	Y			
New Delhi	MT			
Shimla	Y			
Udaipur	6			
Indian diaspora
Indian Diaspora in Canada			Y	
Indian Diaspora in United States			Y	
Total	18	22	29	26
Color keys: : Declared as the winner; : Ended as a 1st runner-up; : Ended as a 2nd runner-up; : Ended as a 3rd runner-up; : Ended as a 4th runner-up; : Ended as a 5th runner-up; A : Ended as a Miss Charm (MC), Miss Cosmo (MCO) and Miss Tourism (MT); N : Ended as a finalist, semifinalist (N) and unplaced (Y); × : Ended as withdrew during the competition; × : Ended as no representative
