= Monica Sharma =

Indian model, television & film actress

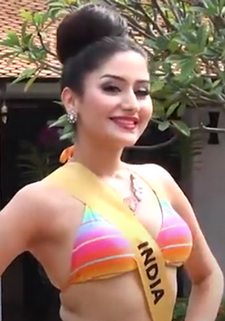
- Occupations: Actress, model
- Years active: 2014–present
- Title: Miss Grand India 2014

Monica Sharma is an Indian model, television and film actress. She appeared in the Colors TV show Shrimad Bhagwat Mahapuran as the goddess Ganga.

== Career ==
She won the title of Miss Grand India 2014 and subsequently represented India as a contestant at the Miss Grand International 2014 pageant held in Bangkok, Thailand.

In 2015, Sharma began her television career with &TV's Dilli Wali Thakur Gurls. Her next show was Colors TV's Naagin 2 where she portrayed a supporting role. In 2018, she starred in Colors TV's Sasural Simar Ka and made an episodic appearance in the channel's horror supernatural thriller Kaun Hai?. Sharma next played cameo roles in Star Plus's Kasautii Zindagii Kay and &TV's Vikram Betaal Ki Rahasya Gatha. In April 2019, she was offered to enter Star Bharat's Pyaar Ke Papad.

In 2019 she played the role of Shivika in ek ichadhari ki dastaan on Dangal TV in a lead role.

== Television ==
Year	Show	Role	Channel
2015	Dilli Wali Thakur Gurls	Chandralekha Thakur	And TV
2016–2017	Naagin 2	Gautami	Colors TV
2018	Sasural Simar Ka	Avni Piyush Bharadwaj	Colors TV
2018	Kaun Hai?	Radhika	Colors TV
2018	Kasautii Zindagii Kayy	Keerti	Star Plus
2019	Vikram Betaal Ki Rahasya Gatha	Ulupi	And TV
2019	Laal Ishq Episode 143	Varsha	And TV
2019	Shivarjun Ek Ichchadhari Ki Dastaan	Shivika	Dangal
2019	Shrimad Bhagwat Mahapuran	Goddess Ganga in Hinduism	Colors TV
2022	Neighbours	Priyanka	YouTube

== Movies ==
Year	Film	Role	Language	Production
2019	Teri Meri Jodi	Roop	Punjabi	Aditya Films
2022	Jalwayu Enclave	Tanya	Punjabi	The Theater Army Films
2022	Khuda Haafiz: Chapter 2 – Agni Pariksha	Kalki	Hindi	Panorama Studios
2025	Mr & Mrs 420 Again (Part 3)		Punjabi	
