= Miss Grand India 2026 =

4th Miss Grand India pageant

- Date: 12 May 2026
- Presenters: Sakul Limpapanon; Sweezal Furtado
- Venue: Talkatora Stadium, New Delhi
- Broadcaster: YouTube
- Entrants: 26
- Placements: 15
- Debuts: Andhra Pradesh; Chandigarh; Haryana; Lakshadweep; Manipur; Puducherry; Tamil Nadu; Uttarakhand
- Withdrawals: Indian Diaspora in Canada; Madhya Pradesh; Mizoram
- Returns: Kerala; Meghalaya
- Winner: Lakshita Thilagaraj; Tamilnadu
- Congeniality: Yeshi Lhamu, Arunachal Pradesh
- Best National Costume: Bhoomika Lalwani, Delhi
- Photogenic: Ann Shiya Aneesh, Lakshadweep
- Best in Swimsuit: Mrigashree Baruah, Assam
- Best in Evening Gown: Yeshi Lhamu, Arunachal Pradesh

Miss Grand India 2026 was the 4th edition of the Miss Grand India pageant, held on 12 May 2026 at Talkatora Stadium, New Delhi.

Vishakha Kanwar of Rajasthan crowned Lakshita Thilagaraj of Tamil Nadu as her successor at the end of the event. Lakshita will represent India at the Miss Grand International 2026 pageant, scheduled to be held in October 2026 in India.

== Background ==
=== Location and date ===
On 22 April 2026 the Miss Grand India Organization officially announced the final schedule.The organizers announced Talkatora Stadium, New Delhi as the venue of pageant.The event will take place from 29 April to 12 May, with the Grand Final planned for 12 May 2026.

=== Schedule ===
On 22 April 2026, the Miss Grand India Organization announced their official activities during the competition, which are included:

Miss Grand India 2026: Schedule of Activities
Date	Event
April 29	Arrival Day
April 30	Talent round
May 1	Orientation & Sashing Ceremony
May 2	Closed Door Interview
May 3	Rehearsals
May 4	Welcome Ceremony & Press Conference
May 5	Swimsuit Competition
May 6	NGO Visit
May 7	Fashion Week
May 8	Rehearsals
May 9	Bollywood Theme Gala Night
May 10	National Costume Competition
May 11	Rehearsals
May 12	Grand Final

== Results ==
=== Placements ===
Placement	Contestant
Miss Grand India 2026	Tamil Nadu – Lakshita Thilagaraj
1st Runner-Up	Assam – Mrigashree Baruah
2nd Runner-Up	Meghalaya – Tanvi Marak
3rd Runner-Up	Uttar Pradesh – Saanjh Khurana
4th Runner-Up	West Bengal – Reshmi Deokota
5th Runner-Up	Sikkim – Sneha Tamang (Note: Automatically advanced to the Top 6 as the People's Choice Awardee)
Top 15	Arunachal Pradesh – Yeshi Lhamu; Delhi – Bhoomika Lalwani; Gujarat - Zahabiya Daginawala; Haryana – Gopika Saji; Kerala – K.S. Aswini; Manipur – Babina Thokchom; Nagaland – Lovikali Swu; Rajasthan – Meenakshi Chhapola; Telangana – Sapna Chaubey; Tripura – Hritwika Majumder

=== Sub-title Awards ===
A total of 7 sub-title awards were given.

Awards	Candidate
Best in Culture Wear	Meghalaya – Tanvi Marak
Best in Evening Gown	Arunachal Pradesh – Yeshi Lhamu
Best In Gala Wear	Kerala – K.S. Aswini
Best National Costume	Delhi – Bhoomika Lalwani
Best in Swimsuit	Assam – Mrigashree Baruah
Best in Interview	Tamil Nadu – Lakshita Thilagaraj
Best in Talent Round	Karnataka – Chalana Agnihotri

=== Special awards ===
Before the winner was announced, these special awards were given.

Awards	Candidate
Miss Beautiful	Rajasthan – Meenakshi Chhapola
Miss Beautiful Eyes	Chandigarh – E.R. Aishwarya
Miss Beauty With Brain	Tamil Nadu - Lakshita Thilagaraj
Miss Beauty With Purpose	Maharashtra – Nishita Tahilramani
Miss Charisma	Haryana – Gopika Saji
MIss Confident	Jharkhand – Neha Kisku
Miss Congeniality	Arunachal Pradesh – Yeshi Lhamu
Miss Elegant	Meghalaya – Tanvi Marak
Miss Fashion Icon	Delhi – Bhoomika Lalwani
Miss Glamours Face	West Bengal – Reshmi Deokota
Miss Glowing Skin	Nagaland – Lovikali Swu
Miss Inspirational	Sikkim – Sneha Tamang
Miss Intellectual	Andhra Pradesh – Divya Varanasi
Miss Perfect Body	Assam – Mrigashree Baruah
Miss Perfect Smile	Puducherry – Shamaritha Sugumar
Miss Photogenic	Lakshadweep – Ann Shiya Aneesh
Miss Radient Personality	Tripura – Hritwika Majumder
Miss Ravishing	Bihar – Shreya Verma
Miss Resilient	Telangana – Sapna Chaubey
Miss Rising Star	Uttarakhand – Manisha Singh
Miss Sensational	Karnataka – Chalana Agnihotri
Miss Social Media	Kerala – K.S. Aswini
Miss Social Media Queen	Manipur – Babina Thokchom
Miss Top Model	Gujarat - Zahabiya Daginawala

== Selection of contestants ==
This year’s competition will follow a multi-tier selection process, beginning with state-level competitions conducted nationwide. Representative from each state and union territory are selected to advance to the national-level competition.

=== Debuts and returns ===
This edition marks the debuts of union territories Chandigarh, Lakshadweep and Puducherry, and the statesAndhra Pradesh, Haryana, Manipur, Tamil Nadu and Uttarakhand. Additionally, this edition features the returns of Kerala and Meghalaya which all last competed in 2024.

=== Withdrawals and replacements ===
For this edition, there were no representative from Indian Diaspora in Canada, Madhya Pradesh and Mizoram.

On March 6, the state organization of Miss Grand Arunachal Pradesh announced on instagram that Geyir Gongo has resigned from her title due to personal reason and Yeshi Lhamu is appointed as new representative. Honli Konyak Miss Grand Nagaland 2026 resigned due to personal reason and replaced by Lovikali Swu.

Additionally Miss Grand Bihar 2026 Nidhi Singh and Miss Grand West Bengal 2026 Kodila Bagchi, are replaced with Sherya Verma and Reshmi Deokota respectively for unknown reasons.

Miss Grand Andaman and Nicobar Islands 2026 Khushi Dey did not compete for unknown reason. Miss Grand Punjab 2026 Ashita Banarwal was replaced with Guramrit Kaur later she also didn't compete. Similarly Miss Grand Jammu and Kashmir 2026 Muskan Devi was replaced with Simran Randhawa and she also didn't compete.

== Contestants ==
The following contestants have been confirmed.

State/Territory	Contestant
Andhra Pradesh	Divya Varanasi
Arunachal Pradesh	Yeshi Lhamu
Assam	Mrigashree Baruah
Bihar	Shreya Verma
Chandigarh	E.R. Aishwarya
Chhattisgarh	Praveena Mandal
Delhi	Bhoomika Lalwani
Gujarat	Zahabiya Daginawala
Haryana	Gopika Saji
Jharkhand	Neha Kisku
Karnataka	Chalana Agnihotri
Kerala	K.S. Aswini
Lakshadweep	Ann Shiya Aneesh
Maharashtra	Nishita Tahilramani
Manipur	Babina Thokchom
Meghalaya	Tanvi Marak
Nagaland	Lovikali Swu
Puducherry	Shamaritha Sugumar
Rajasthan	Meenakshi Chhapola
Sikkim	Sneha Tamang
Tamil Nadu	Lakshita Thilagaraj
Telangana	Sapna Chaubey
Tripura	Hritwika Majumder
Uttar Pradesh	Saanjh Khurana
Uttarakhand	Manisha Singh
West Bengal	Reshmi Deokota
