= Arshina Sumbul =

Indian model, dancer and beauty pageant titleholder (born 2002)

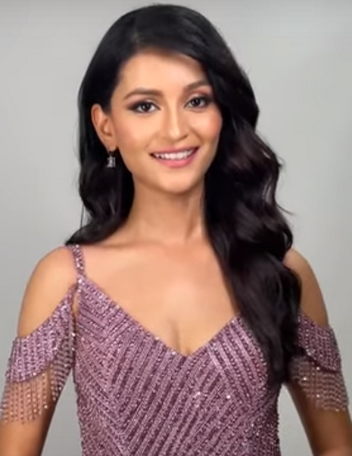
- Arshina Sumbul in 2023
- Born: 14/01/2002; Jaipur, India
- Education: Kanoria PG Mahila Mahavidyalaya
- Height: 1.71 m (5 ft 7 1/2 in)
- Beauty pageant titleholder
- Title: Miss Grand India 2023
- Hair color: Dark brown
- Eye color: Brown
- Major competitions: Miss Universe India 2020 (Top 10); Glamanand Supermodel India 2022 (2nd Runner-up); Miss Grand India 2023 (Winner); Miss Grand International 2023 (Top 20)

Arshina Sumbul (Hindi: ार्शिना सुम्बुल) is an Indian model and beauty pageant titleholder who was crowned Miss India Grand International 2023 at the grand finale of Glamanand Supermodel India 2023. She represented India at the Miss Grand International 2023 pageant held in Vietnam on 25 October 2023 where she was one of the top 20 semifinalists.

== Pageantry ==
Arshina's pageantry journey began at the age of 20, when she won Elite Miss Rajasthan 2018, a state-wide pageant in West India. She then went on to participate in Miss Diva 2020, where she made it to the Top 10 semifinalists. In 2022, she competed in Glamanand Supermodel India and became 2nd runner-up.

In 2023, Arshina took part in Glamanand Supermodel India once again and won the title of Miss Grand India 2023 at the grand finale held on 19 September 2023 at the Zee Studios in Jaipur. She represented India at the Miss Grand International 2023 pageant held in Vietnam on 25 October 2023 and made it to the top 20.

Awards and achievements
Preceded by Praachi Nagpal	Miss Grand India; 2023	Succeeded by Rachel Gupta
