= Miss Grand Peru 2023 =

1st Miss Grand Peru competition, beauty pageant edition

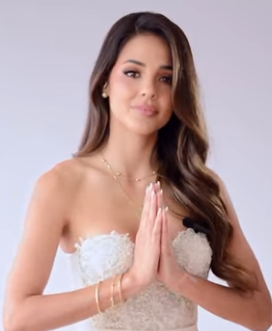
- Luciana Fuster, the winner of the contest
- Date: 22 June 2023
- Presenters: María Pía Copello; Mario Hart; Carlos Vílchez
- Venue: América Televisión Studio, Lima
- Broadcaster: América Televisión; Movistar TV; DirecTV; Claro TV; Cablemás; Best Cable; Cable Perú; Visión Perú
- Entrants: 11
- Placements: 5
- Debuts: Ancash; Apurímac; Arequipa; Callao; Huánuco; Junín; Lambayeque; Loreto; Metro Lima; Piura; Ucayali
- Winner: Luciana Fuster; Callao

Miss Grand Peru 2023 competition result by department
Colors key
Winner	Fourth runner-up
First runner-up	Unplaced
Second runner-up	Withdrew
Third runner-up	No representative

Miss Grand Peru 2023 was the inaugural edition of the Miss Grand Peru pageant, held at the América Televisión Studio in Lima on June 22, 2023. Eleven candidates who qualified for the pageant through a virtual casting held earlier in January competed for the title, of whom, a 24-year-old Internet personality from Callao, Luciana Fuster, was elected the winner. Luciana represented Peru at the Miss Grand International 2023, held in Vietnam on October 25, 2023, and won, making her the second Peruvian woman to win the crown.

The grand final round of the contest was hosted by María Pía Copello, Mario Hart, and Carlos Vílchez, and was broadcast to the audiences nationwide via a television program named 'Mande quien mande' on the América Televisión channel, as well as several subscription television services, including Movistar TV, DirecTV, Claro TV, Cablemás, Best Cable, Cable Perú, and Visión Perú.

== Background ==
Previously, Peruvian representatives for the Miss Grand International pageant from 2014 to 2022 were either appointed or selected through the Miss Peru contest. However, after the revealing of the finalists for the Miss Peru 2023 pageant, which consisted of 28 candidates, the pageant director, who also holds the license of Miss Grand Peru since 2014, Jessica Newton, planned to arrange a separate pageant to determine the country representative for the Miss Grand International 2023, and all 28 qualified candidates were permitted to compete for only one of which; 12 candidates chose the Miss Grand pageant.

== Result ==
=== Placements ===
Placement	Contestant
Miss Grand Peru 2023	Callao – Luciana Fuster Guzmán
1st runner-up	Ancash – Pia Requejo
2nd runner-up	Arequipa – Zuliet Seminario
3rd runner-up	Huánuco – Brenda Serpa
4th runner-up	Lambayeque – Michelle Choque

== Candidates ==
Initially, candidates from twelve regions confirmed to compete; however, Mayra Messa of Lima withdrew from the contest, making the finalized total of eleven contestants.

- Ancash – Pia Requejo
- Apurímac – Anahy de la Colina
- Arequipa – Zuliet Seminario
- Callao – Luciana Fuster
- Huánuco – Brenda Serpa
- Junín – Sheyla Zuniga
- Lambayeque – Michelle Choque
- Lima – Mayra Messa (withdrew)
- Loreto – Alejandra Espino
- Metro Lima – Fairús Oré
- Piura – Nicolle Tassara
- Ucayali – Carla Ramos
