= Luciana Fuster =

Peruvian beauty pageant titleholder (born 1999)

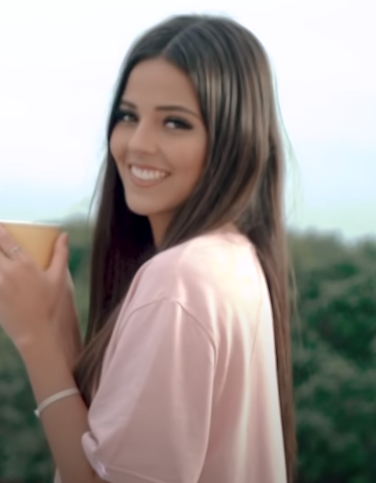
- Fuster in 2023
- Born: Luciana Fuster Guzmán; January 14, 1999 (age 27); Callao, Peru
- Education: Peruvian University of Applied Sciences
- Height: 1.72 m (5 ft 8 in)
- Beauty pageant titleholder
- Title: Miss Teen Model Peru 2015; Miss Teen Pageant International 2016; Miss Grand Peru 2023; Miss Grand International 2023
- Major competitions: Miss Grand Peru 2023; (Winner); Miss Grand International 2023; (Winner)

Luciana Fuster Guzmán (born January 14, 1999) is a Peruvian beauty pageant titleholder who was crowned Miss Grand Peru 2023 and later won the international title of Miss Grand International 2023. Previously, Fuster won the title of Miss Teen Model Peru 2015 and the Miss Teen Pageant International 2016.

Fuster became known for her television popularity after participating in the television reality shows, Combate, on the ATV channel and Esto es guerra on América Televisión, as well as becoming the host of the radio program Onda expansiva on the radio station Onda Cero from 2022 to 2023.

In 2021, Comscore included Fuster in the list of internet celebrities with the most interaction in Latin America during 2020.

== Early life and education ==
Fuster was born in Callao, on January 14, 1999, into a middle-class family. She studied primary and secondary school at the Admiral Guise Naval Lyceum School, located in the district of San Borja, and obtained a bachelor's degree in mass communication from the University of San Martín de Porres. Since she was a teenager, she dedicated herself to becoming a volleyball and basketball player in the local championships of her category, with minor participation on the courts.

== Pageantry ==
Fuster won her first pageant, Miss Teen Model Peru 2015, at the age of 15. She then represented Peru and won Miss Teen Pageant International 2016 in Porto Alegre, Brazil.

=== Miss Grand Peru 2023 ===
Later in 2023, Fuster applied for the Miss Peru pageant, which was previously held to determine the Peruvian candidates for Miss Universe, Miss Grand International, and others. However, after Fuster was elected as one of the 28 qualified candidates, the pageant director decided to organize Miss Grand Peru as a separate pageant, and all 28 qualified candidates were permitted to compete for only one title: Fuster and the other 11 candidates chose the Miss Grand pageant, and she eventually won the title.

=== Miss Grand International 2023 ===
After winning the Miss Grand Peru 2023 pageant, Fuster participated in Miss Grand International 2023, held at the Phú Thọ Indoor Stadium in Ho Chi Minh City, Vietnam, on October 25, competing against 68 other candidates and won the main title, making her the second Peruvian candidate to win the title and crowned in Vietnam.

During her reign as Miss Grand International she visited 20 countries, becoming the most traveled Miss Grand International winner overall of all time. Fuster visited countries in Asia, Europe and the Americas, including: Vietnam, Thailand, Indonesia, Myanmar, Peru, United States, Bolivia, El Salvador, Cambodia, Guatemala, France, Spain, Czech Republic, Dominican Republic, Venezuela, Colombia, Brazil, Malaysia, Curaçao and Ecuador.

On October 25, 2024, during the final night of Miss Grand International 2024, Fuster crowned Rachel Gupta of India as her successor. However, months later, Gupta was dethroned and replaced by the first runner-up, Christine Juliane Opiaza from the Philippines.

=== Placements ===
Competition	Placement	Location	Special Awards	Represented
Miss Teen Model Peru 2015	Winner	Lima, Peru		Callao, Peru
Miss Teen Pageant International 2016	Winner	Porto Alegre, Brazil		Peru
Miss Grand Peru 2023	Winner	Lima, Peru		Callao, Peru
Miss Grand International 2023	Winner	Ho Chi Minh City, Vietnam	Top 4 – Country's Power of the Year; Top 10 – Best in Swimsuit; Top 20 – Best National Costume	Peru

== Personal life ==
Fuster was once romantically involved with fitness trainer Patricio Parodi. They officially announced the end of their relationship through a statement on social media in July 2024. Months later, she began to be linked to Colombian music producer Juan Morelli and both confirmed the relationship in January 2025.

== Filmography ==
=== Television programs ===
Year	Program	Genre	Role	Broadcaster	Ref.
2015	Esto es guerra Teens	Reality show	Competitor	América Televisión	
2015	Esto es guerra	Reality show	Competitor	América Televisión	
2016	Reto de campeones	Reality show	Competitor	Latina Televisión	
2017	Ven, baila, quinceañera	Television series	Antonella	América Televisión	
2017	El Gran Show	Dance reality show	Competitor	América Televisión	
2017	Esto es guerra	Reality show	Competitor	América Televisión	
2017–2018	Combate	Reality show	Competitor	ATV	
2018	Espectáculos en ATV	Reality show	Co-host	ATV	
2019	Válgame Dios	Game Show	Host	Latina Televisión	
2019	Esto es guerra	Reality television	Competitor	América Televisión	
2020	People VIP	Game Show	Co-host	Streaming (by People en Español)	
2020	¡Hola! USA	Television interview	Guest	¡Hola! TV	
2020	Hoy	Morning television show	Guest	Las Estrellas	
2020	La resolana	Talk show	Guest	Azteca Uno	
2021	Esto es guerra	Reality show	Competitor	América Televisión	
2021	El gran show	Dance reality show	Competitor	América Televisión	
2021	Guerra México vs. Perú	Reality show	Competitor	Canal 5 y América Televisión	
2022	Esto es Habacilar	Game show	Model	América Televisión	
2023	Esto es guerra	Reality show	Competitor	América Televisión	

=== Films and theater ===
Year	Title	Genre	Role	Ref.
2017	Una comedia macabra	Comedy horror film	La Novia	
2018	Depa 302	Theater	Mercedes	
2023	Prohibido salir	Comedy film	Liliana	

=== Radio ===
Year	Title	Role	Broadcaster	Ref.
2020–2021	El búnker	Announcer	Onda Cero	
2021–2022	¡Asu, qué tarde!	Announcer	Onda Cero	
2022–2023	Onda expansiva	Announcer	Onda Cero	

Awards and achievements
Preceded by (Brazil) Isabella Menin	Miss Grand International; 2023	Succeeded by (India) Rachel Gupta (Dethroned) (Philippines) CJ Opiaza (Assumed)
Preceded by Janet Leyva	Miss Grand Peru; 2023	Succeeded by Arlette Rujel
