= Rachel Gupta =

Indian beauty pageant titleholder (born 2004)

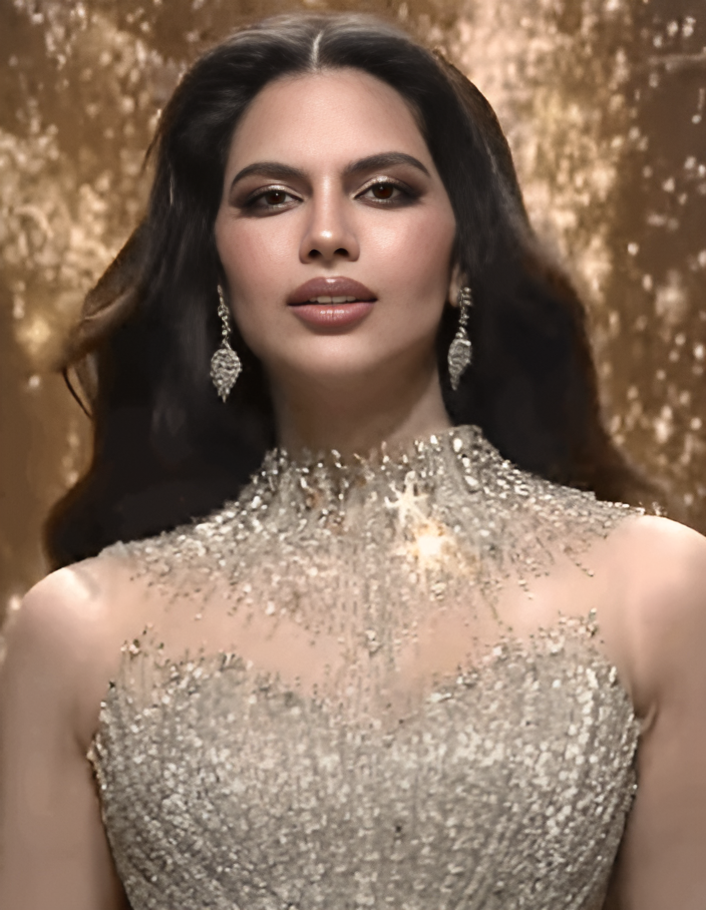
- Gupta in 2024
- Born: 23 January 2004 (age 22); Patiala, Punjab, India
- Occupation: Model
- Height: 1.78 m (5 ft 10 in)
- Beauty pageant titleholder
- Title: Miss Supertalent of the World 2022; Miss Grand India 2024
- Major competitions: Miss Supertalent of the World 2022; (Winner); Miss Grand India 2024; (Winner); Miss Grand International 2024; (Winner; Dethroned)

Rachel Gupta (born 23 January 2004) is an Indian model and beauty pageant titleholder who was crowned Miss Grand International 2024, the first Indian to win Miss Grand International. Her reign concluded in May 2025 prematurely after her internal issues with the organization. She was previously crowned Miss Grand India 2024 and Miss Super Talent of the World 2022.

== Early life ==
Rachel Gupta was born on 23 January 2004, in Patiala, Punjab, India, to business professionals Rajesh Aggarwal and Jennifer Gupta. She subsequently grew up in Jalandhar, Punjab, along with her younger sister, Rhea.

== Pageantry ==
=== Miss Super Talent of the World 2022 ===
At the age of 18, Gupta participated in the fifteenth season of Miss Supertalent, held on 28 September 2022, in Paris, France in collaboration with Paris Fashion Week. Approximately 50 countries worldwide sent representatives to compete for the coveted title. The grand finale took place on the same day at the Pavilion Cambon, Paris. She ended up as the winner of the competition.

=== Miss Grand India 2024 ===
In May 2024, Gupta was announced as a finalist for the Miss Grand India 2024 competition organized by the Glamanand Group. At the grand finale held on 11 August 2024, she was crowned as Miss Grand India 2024 by the outgoing titleholder Arshina Sumbul at Zee Studios in Jaipur, Rajasthan. During the competition, she also won the sub-titles of Miss Top Model, Best in Ramp Walk, Beauty with a Purpose, and Best National Costume.

As Miss Grand India 2024, Gupta travelled to Thailand as a special guest for both the preliminary and final event of the Miss Grand Suraburi 2025 competition. During her visit, she also took the opportunity to support the Foundation for Slum Child Care in Bangkok, donating essential items valued at 10,000 THB to aid the foundation's important work.

=== Miss Grand International 2024 ===
Gupta represented India at the Miss Grand International 2024 pageant, held in Thailand from late September to 25 October 2024. Although not a frontrunner at the beginning of the event, she gradually gained momentum among pageant fans. At the end of the event, she was crowned as the winner by the outgoing titleholder, Luciana Fuster of Peru. With her victory, she became the first Indian and the third Asian to win the Miss Grand International crown.

On 28 May 2025, Gupta resigned as Miss Grand International 2024 due to an alleged conflict with the Miss Grand International organization, on the grounds that she received unpleasant treatment while on duty. The first runner-up, Christine Juliane Opiaza of the Philippines assumed the title as Miss Grand International 2024.

Awards and achievements
Preceded by (Peru) Luciana Fuster	Miss Grand International (Dethroned); 2024	Succeeded by (Philippines) CJ Opiaza (Assumed)
Preceded by Arshina Sumbul	Miss Grand India; 2024	Succeeded by Vishakha Kanwar
Preceded by (Romania) Alexandra Stroe	Miss Super Talent of the World; 2022	Succeeded by (Czech Republic) Anna Rordriguez
