= Miss Grand Sabah =

State pageant in Sabah, Malaysia

- Formation: April 30, 2017; 9 years ago
- Founder: Severinus Alexius Nain
- Type: Beauty pageant
- Headquarters: Kota Kinabalu
- Location: Sabah, Malaysia
- Members: Miss Grand Malaysia
- Official language: English; Malay
- State Director: Severinus A. Nain (2017–2019); Geoallen George (2020–2021); Richard Chok (2024–Present)
- Parent organization: Gemilang Event Management (2024–Present)

Miss Grand Sabah is a Malaysian state-level beauty pageant which selects representatives from Sabah for the Miss Grand Malaysia national competition, founded in 2017 by a Kota Kinabalu-based event organizer, Severinus Alexius Nain.

Since the first competition in the Miss Grand Malaysia pageant, Sabah's representatives won the competition three times streak from 2017 to 2019, by Sanjeda John, Debra Jeanne Poh, and Mel Dequanne Abar, respectively.

== History ==
After acquiring the license of Miss Grand Malaysia in 2017, Jude Benjamin Lisa began franchising the state competitions to individual organizers, who would name the state representatives to compete in the national pageant, the license for Sabah was granted to an event organizer, Severinus Alexius Nain, who then organized the first contest of Miss Grand Sabah in Kota Kinabalu, in which a 20-year-old Disc jockey from Kadazan, Felcy Fransie Julian, was named the first Miss Grand Sabah titleholder, while Sanjeda John was named Miss Intercontinental Sabah 2017. Both of them later competed nationally in the Miss Grand Malaysia 2017 pageant in Selangor, where Sanjeda John was announced the winner.

In 2018, Nain distributed the right to send candidates to compete at the Miss Grand Sabah pageant to district-level organizers; six district pageants was held. Boi Nain lost the license to another organizer, Geoallen George, in 2020.

The pageant was halted in 2022 after the national license of Miss Grand Malaysia was transferred to Sean Wong of HyperLive Entertainment Pte. Ltd., and the state franchise was not distributed in 2022 and 2023. HyperLive then began franchising the license in 2024, in which the Sabah certification was granted to Richard Chok of the Fantastic Golden.

== Editions ==
The following table details Miss Grand Sabah's annual editions since 2017.

Edition	Date	Final venue	Entrants	Winner	Ref.
1st	April 30, 2017	Pacific Sutera Hotel, Kota Kinabalu	14	Felcy Fransie Julian	
2nd	March 24, 2018	Auditorium Complex JKKN Sabah, Kota Kinabalu	35	Scarlett Megan Liew	
3rd	March 9, 2019	Palm Square Center Point, Kota Kinabalu	36	Mel Dequanne Abar	
4th	April 9, 2021	Klagen Regency Hotel, Kota Kinabalu	25	Chellyana Tensu	
5th	June 25, 2024	Sabah International Convention Centre, Kota Kinabalu	8	Lilyannie Christie	

== National competition ==
The following is a list of candidates who competed at the Miss Grand Malaysia pageant under the state organization of Miss Grand Sabah.

Color keys

For qualification procedure:	For national placement:
W State winner	Winner
R State runner-up	Runner-up
S State wildcard	Semi-finalists
C Central wildcard	Quarter-finalists

Year	Representative	Original state title	Placement at Miss Grand Malaysia	State director	Ref.
2017	W Felcy Fransie Julian	Miss Grand Sabah 2017	Top 7	Severinus Alexius Nain	
2017	R Sanjeda John	Miss Intercontinental Sabah 2017	Miss Grand Malaysia 2017	Severinus Alexius Nain	
2018	W Scarlett Megan Liew	Miss Grand Sabah 2018	2nd runner-up	Severinus Alexius Nain	
2018	R Kate Cantwell	1st runner-up Miss Grand Sabah 2018	1st runner-up	Severinus Alexius Nain	
2018	R Debra Jeanne Poh	2nd runner-up Miss Grand Sabah 2018	Miss Grand Malaysia 2018	Severinus Alexius Nain	
2018	S Cynthia Avat Aing	Miss Grand Sabah 2018 Finalist	Unplaced	Severinus Alexius Nain	
2018	S Saneeha Sajoo	Miss Grand Sabah 2018 Finalist	Withdrew	Severinus Alexius Nain	
2019	W Mel Dequanne Abar	Miss Grand Sabah 2019	Miss Grand Malaysia 2019	Severinus Alexius Nain	
2019	R Valerie Sim	1st runner-up Miss Grand Sabah 2019	Top 12	Severinus Alexius Nain	
2019	S Malle Christian Anderson	Miss Grand Sabah 2019 Finalist	Unplaced	Severinus Alexius Nain	
2019	S Michelle Voo	Miss Grand Sabah 2019 Finalist	Unplaced	Severinus Alexius Nain	
2019	S Velma Victorianus	Miss Grand Sabah 2019 Finalist	Unplaced	Severinus Alexius Nain	
2021	W Chellyana Tensu	Miss Grand Sabah 2020	Unplaced	Geoallen George	
2021	R Dewi Natasha	1st runner-up Miss Grand Sabah 2020	Top 10	Geoallen George	
2021	R Anya Kimberly	2nd runner-up Miss Grand Sabah 2020	Top 5	Geoallen George	
2021	S Marvena Jitol	Miss Grand Sabah 2020 Finalist	Unplaced	Geoallen George	
2024	W Lilyannie Christie	Miss Grand Sabah 2024	2nd runner-up	Richard Chok	
2024	R Esther Marius	1st runner-up Miss Grand Sabah 2024	4th runner-up	Richard Chok	
2024	R Rochil Apa Sagarino	2nd runner-up Miss Grand Sabah 2024	Unplaced	Richard Chok	
2024	R Shareen Jee	3rd runner-up Miss Grand Sabah 2024	Unplaced	Richard Chok	
2024	R Rachel Alphine Peter	4th runner-up Miss Grand Sabah 2024	Unplaced	Richard Chok	
2025	R Rochil Apa Sagarino	4th runner-up Miss Grand Sabah 2024	2nd runner-up	Richard Chok	
