= Miss Grand Malaysia 2024 =

9th Miss Grand Malaysia competition

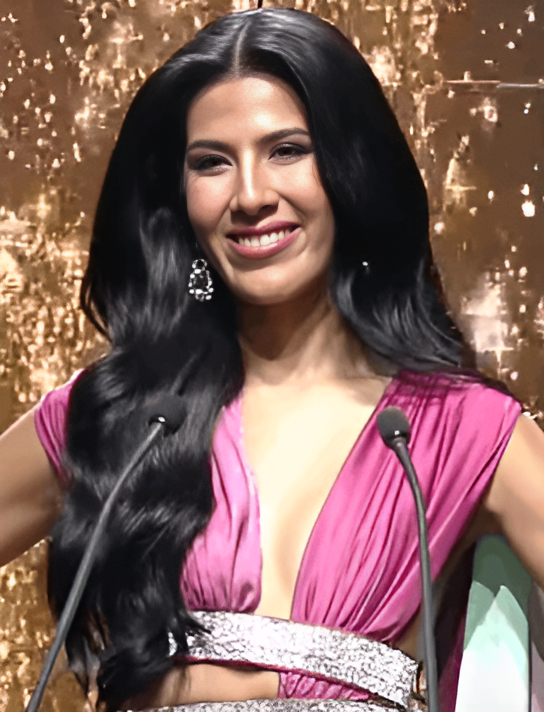
- Melisha Lin, the winner of the contest
- Date: 22 August 2024
- Presenters: Sean Wong
- Venue: Galaxy Banque, HGH Convention Centre, Kuala Lumpur
- Broadcaster: YouTube
- Entrants: 12
- Placements: 6
- Winner: Melisha Lin (Selangor)
- Photogenic: Ashlyn Devissha (Selangor)

Miss Grand Malaysia 2024 was the 9th edition of the Miss Grand Malaysia pageant, held on 22 August 2024 at the Galaxy Banque, HGH Convention Centre, Kuala Lumpur. Twelve candidates, who qualified for the national final through the state pageant in Sabah and the national audition in Kuala Lumpur, competed for the title. Of whom a 25-year-old Chinese-Indian television personality from Selangor, Melisha Lin, was announced the winner. Melisha later represented Malaysia in the international parent stage, Miss Grand International 2024, held in Thailand on October 25, 2024.

The event was co-organized by the Miss Grand Malaysia license holder HyperLive Entertainment and a private-firm event organizer SunStrong Entertainment. It was broadcast on the organizer's YouTube channel. Miss Grand International 2023, Luciana Fuster of Peru, and the vice president of Miss Grand International, Teresa Chaivisut, also presented at the event.

== Background ==
=== Location and date ===
In December 2023, the organizer of Miss Grand Malaysia, HyperLive Entertainment, released an official document mentioning that the 2024 national edition was set for Kuala Lumpur in June 2024; however, it was rescheduled to August 2024 for unknown reasons. The Galaxy Banque Hall was selected as the grand final venue, according to the official reveal made on August 17, 2024.

=== Selection of contestants ===
Only the state of Sabah organized the local pageant to elect representatives for this year's national contest, as detailed in the table below. The remaining contestants were directly chosen by the national licensee through online procedures.

Pageant	Edition	Date	Final venue	Entrants	Qualifier(s)	Ref.
Miss Grand Sabah	5th	June 25, 2024	Sabah International Convention Centre, Kota Kinabalu	8	5	

== Result ==
Position	Delegate
Miss Grand Malaysia 2024	Selangor – Melisha Lin (Note: Automatically qualified for the top 6 after winning the Miss People's Choice award.)
1st runner-up	Kuala Lumpur – Geetha William (Note: Automatically qualified for the top 6 after winning the Best Social Media award.)
2nd runner-up	Sabah – Lilyannie Christie
3rd runner-up	Selangor – Linasni Kusraju
4th runner-up	Sabah – Esther Marius Tito
5th runner-up	Kuala Lumpur – Kiki Khor Xiangqi
Special awards
Miss Photogenic	Selangor – Ashlyn Devissha
Miss Personality	Sabah – Shareen Jee
Miss People's Choice	Selangor – Melisha Lin
Best Evening Gown	Sabah – Lilyannie Christie
Best Social Media	Kuala Lumpur – Geetha William
Sponsors' awards
King King Ambassador	Selangor – Melisha Lin
Key Ng's Preferred Choice	Selangor – Melisha Lin
Miss Olylife	Selangor – Melisha Lin
Miss Puravida	Selangor – Melisha Lin
Miss Niang Jia	Selangor – Melisha Lin
Miss Eloquence	Selangor – Melisha Lin

== Contestants ==
Twelve contestants will compete for the title.

Color key
For qualification procedure:	For national placement:
W State-level pageant winner	Winner
R State pageant's runner-up	Runner-up
C Central audition	Unplaced

Candidate	State	Competition result
C Ashlyn Devissha	Selangor	
R Esther Marius Tito	Sabah	4th runner-up
C Geetha William	Kuala Lumpur	1st runner-up
C Joanneia Selin Joseph	Perak	
C Kiki Khor Xiangqi	Kuala Lumpur	5th runner-up
W Lilyannie Christie	Sabah	2nd runner-up
C Linasni Kusraju	Selangor	3rd runner-up
C Melisha Lin	Selangor	Winner
R Rachel Alphine Peter	Sabah	
R Rochil Apa Sagarino	Sabah	
C Sarah Monika Sow	Perak	
R Shareen Jee	Sabah	
