= Miss Grand Malaysia 2026 =

11th Miss Grand Malaysia competition

- Date: 23 July 2026
- Presenters: Melisha Lin
- Venue: Confetti KL, Seri Kembangan, Selangor
- Broadcaster: YouTube
- Entrants: 12
- Placements: 8
- Winner: Sunoshini Dhanabalan (Negeri Sembilan) (resigned); Vyan Trisni (Selangor) (assumed)

External videos
- Grand final competition

Miss Grand Malaysia 2026 was the 11th edition of the Miss Grand Malaysia pageant, held on 23 July 2026, at the Confetti KL, Seri Kembangan, Selangor. Twelve contestants competed for the title.

Viviana Lin Winston of Sarawak crowned her successor, Sunoshini Dhanabalan of Negeri Sembilan, at the end of the event. Dhanabalan was initially expected to represent Malaysia at the Miss Grand International 2026 pageant in Thailand in October; however, she resigned from the title on 2 August 2026 due to health problems. The first runner-up, Vyan Trisni of Selangor, subsequently succeeded the title and assumed the duties.

The event was also attended by Miss Grand International 2025 Emma Tiglao of the Philippines and the vice president of Miss Grand International Teresa Chaivisut.

== Background ==
=== Selection of contestants ===
For the 2026 edition, the national organizer adopted a mixed selection system consisting of state-level pageants and direct appointments. While the state licenses were made available to local organizers to conduct preliminary competitions and recruit representatives, most national delegates were selected directly through profile screening by the national organizer.

Among the state-level selections, only the eastern Malaysian state of Sarawak held a separate qualifying process under a locally managed license. The state representatives were selected through the 5th edition of Miss Grand Sarawak, held on 20 May 2026 at Boulevard Shopping Mall in Miri. A total of 14 contestants competed in the pageant, from which the top contestants advanced to the national competition.

To facilitate recruitment at the sub-state level, the Sarawak organizer further extended divisional licenses to selected local organizers, who were responsible for recruiting or appointing representatives for the state pageant, while some delegates were selected directly by the state license holder. One divisional pageant, Miss Grand Kuching, was organized to determine representatives from Kuching Utara and Kuching Selatan, whereas delegates from other divisions and cities were appointed or recruited through local screening processes.

The following illustrates the selection structure of the 2026 Miss Grand Malaysia competition.

- National pageant: Miss Grand Malaysia
  - State-level qualifiers
    - State pageant: Miss Grand Sarawak
      - Division pageant: Miss Grand Kuching
        - 2 winner titles: Kuching Utara and Kuching Selatan
      - Appointed Division and city representatives
        - 12 appointed titles: Bintulu, Kanowit, Limbang, Lingga, Miri, Mukah, Sebauh, Sibu, Sibu Jaya, Sri Aman, Tanjung Bijat, and Tatau
  - Central registration

=== National preliminary ===
The Preliminary Competition was held on July 21, 2026 at Confetti KL, Seri Kembangan, Selangor featuring national costume segment, fashion show and evening gown segment. During the event, a new crown was also unveiled by the outgoing winner, Viviana Lin Winston. The custom-made crown is specially made in the Philippines.

== Result ==
Position	Delegate
Miss Grand Malaysia 2026	Negeri Sembilan - Sunoshini Dhanabalan (resigned)
1st runner-up	Selangor II - Vyan Trisni (assumed)
2nd runner-up	Sarawak II - Gracelyn Tigang
Top 5	Sabah I - Daniellyn Tan; Selangor III - Dr. Vaishanavi Siva Kumar
Top 8	Sabah II – Dovindra Ashley; Kuala Lumpur II - Vaishi West; Sarawak III - Jacklyn Hon

Special awards
Award	Winner
Top Talent	Kuala Lumpur II - Vaishi West
Best in Evening Gown	Negeri Sembilan – Sunoshini Dhanabalan
SunGenix Ambassador	Sarawak I – Elene Sulissa
BMB Ambassador	Sarawak I – Elene Sulissa
Higo Ambassador	Negeri Sembilan – Sunoshini Dhanabalan
Organica Ambassador	Selangor II - Vyan Trisni
Darling of the Crowd	Sabah I - Daniellyn Tan
Miss Popular	Negeri Sembilan – Sunoshini Dhanabalan

== Contestants ==
The following contestants have been confirmed via Miss Grand Malaysia official Instagram on 22 June 2026. Sarawak was the only state that held state-level pageant to determine the state representatives for this year's edition.

- Sabah I – Daniellyn Tan
- Penang – Dharini
- Sabah II – Dovindra Ashley
- Sarawak I – Elene Sulissa (Note: First runner-up Miss Grand Sarawak 2026)
- Sarawak II - Gracelyn Tigang (Note: Miss Grand Sarawak 2026)
- Sarawak III - Jacklyn Hon (Note: Wildcard)
- Kuala Lumpur I - Melody Goh
- Selangor I - Michelle Jackson
- Negeri Sembilan - Sunoshini Dhanabalan
- Kuala Lumpur II - Vaishi West
- Selangor II - Vyan Trisni
- Selangor III - Dr. Vaishanavi Siva Kumar

== Pageant ==
=== Preliminary competition judges ===
- Faiz Noh - Founder and President of Double Event Management
- Edwin Richard - Co-founder of the Malaysian Beauty Pageant Fan Club (MBPFC)
- Kash Bhullar - Miss Grand Malaysia 2023
- Benjamin Toong - Catwalk guru
- Rizky - Founder of Spoza Rizky Couture
- Carrie Lam - Principal, Sub International Beauty School

=== Grand final judges ===
- Faiz Noh - Founder and President of Double Event Management
- Kash Bhullar - Miss Grand Malaysia 2023
- Edwin Richard - Co-founder of the Malaysian Beauty Pageant Fan Club (MBPFC)
- Riesa Anne - PR Manager of Confetti KL and Co-founder of Goddess of Nature Malaysia
- Kim Dong Gyun - CEO of Yonsei Saebom Medical Clinic Asia
- Lee Min Qi - The Miss Globe Malaysia 2024
