= Miss Grand Malaysia 2021 =

6th Miss Grand Malaysia competition, beauty pageant edition

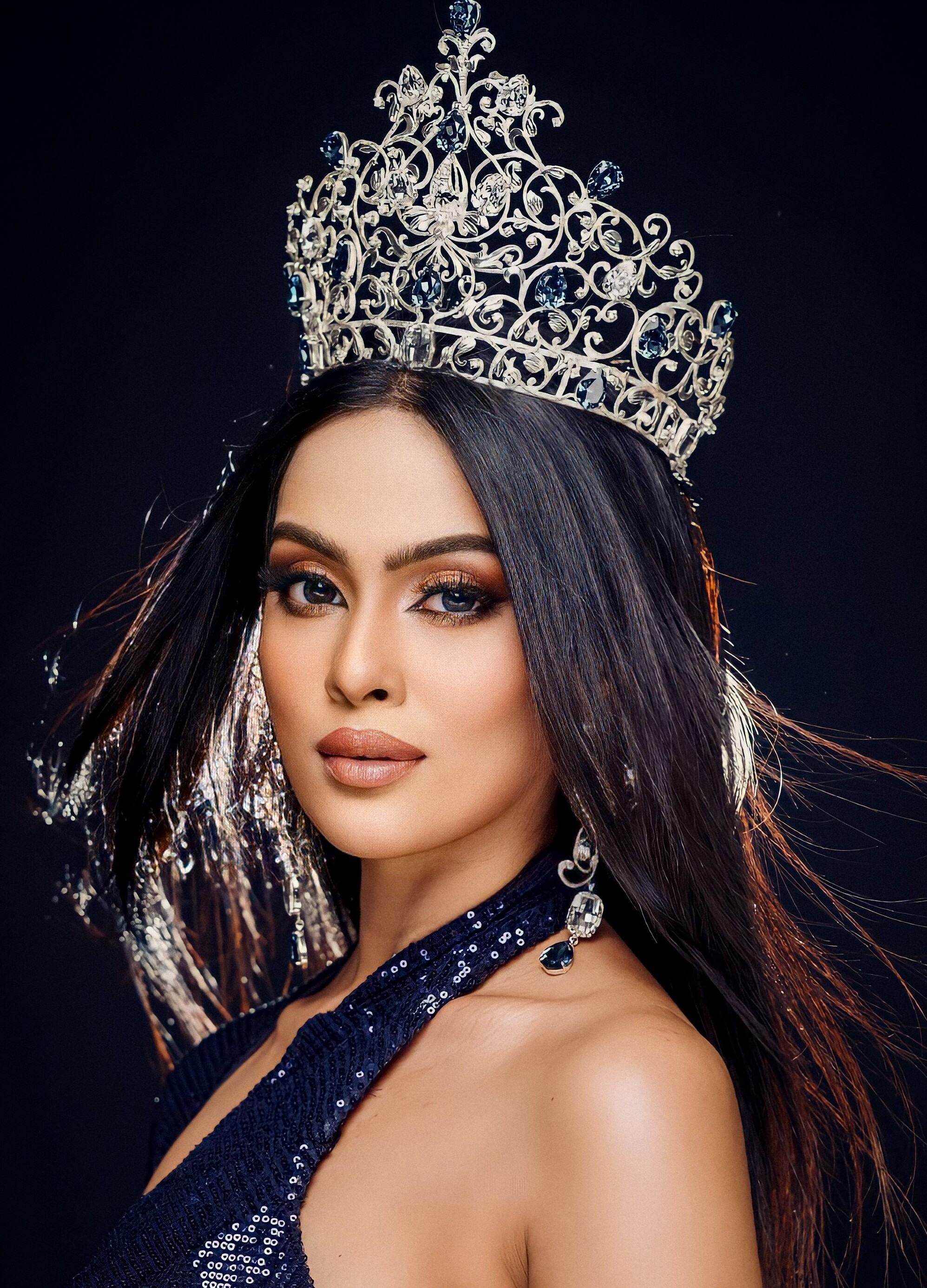
- Lishallinny Kanaran, the winner of the contest
- Date: August 2, 2021
- Venue: Online pageant
- Broadcaster: YouTube
- Entrants: 23
- Placements: 10
- Winner: Lishallinny Kanaran (Selangor)

Miss Grand Malaysia 2021 was the sixth edition of the Miss Grand Malaysia pageant, held virtually via Facebook Live on August 2, 2021. Twenty-three candidates, who qualified for the national pageant either through state pageants or national auditions, competed for the title, and a 24-year-old architecture student from Selangor, Lishallinny Kanaran, was named the winner, while Malveen Kaur of Johor Bahru and Poorani Rajoo of Kuala Lumpur won the supplementary titles of The Miss Globe Malaysia 2021 and Miss Intercontinental Malaysia 2021, respectively. Lishallinny later represented Malaysia in its parent international pageant, Miss Grand International 2021, in Thailand, where she was placed among the top 10 finalists and also won the Best National Costume award.

Initially, the pageant was scheduled to be held physically at the Bangi Avenue Convention Centre in Selangor but was switched to an online contest due to the domestic COVID-19 pandemic and the restriction of movement order announced by the Malaysian government.

== Background ==
In 2020, the Miss Grand Malaysia 2020 pageant was expected to be held physically at the Bangi Avenue Convention Centre in late June, but it was postponed twice due to the COVID-19 pandemic, first to mid-October, and then to January 30, 2021. However, in early 2021, the situation of the outbreak had not improved, causing the organizer to canceled all pageant-related activities and instead arranged an ad hoc online challenge to elect the 2020 titleholder, and Jasebel Robert of Selangor was elected the challenge winner and gain the right to participate at the Miss Grand International 2020 in Thailand, while the remaining candidates were qualified to compete at the 2021 national contest automatically.

In 2021, the organizer planned to hold the actual annual contest to select the country representative for the 2021 Miss Grand International pageant; the pageant boot camps were performed for several days, and it was almost reached the grand final competition, which was scheduled to be held at the Bangi Avenue Convention Centre in Selangor, but due to the increase of COVID-19-infected cases in the country, the organizer canceled all physical pageant activities, and held the pageant virtually instead.

== Regional pageants ==
In addition to the former Miss Grand Malaysia 2020 finalists who automatically qualified for the 2021 national stage, the regional preliminary pageants in Sabah and Sarawak were also held. In both such states, division-level pageants were also held to determine the local representatives for the state-level contest. To complete the 24 finalists, the central organizer also organized an audion in Kuala Lumpur as well as ran the wild card system to additionally select the contestants.

The state preliminary pageants of Miss Grand Malaysia 2021 are detailed in the table below.

State preliminary contests of Miss Grand Malaysia 2021
State pageant	Final date and venue	Entrants	National qualifier(s)			Ref.
State pageant	Final date and venue	Entrants	Winner	Runner-up	Wild card	Ref.
Miss Grand Kuala Lumpur	March 15, 2020, at the Swiss-Garden Hotel Bukit Bintang, Kuala Lumpur	14	1	2	1	
Miss Grand Selangor	July 25, 2020, at the Malaysia Tourism Centre (MaTiC), Kuala Lumpur	10	1	1	2	
Miss Grand Sabah	April 9, 2021, at the Klagen Regency Hotel, Kota Kinabalu	25	1	2	1	
Miss Grand Sarawak	Virtual pageant, on March 7, 2021	10	1	1	0	

== Results ==
Position	Delegate
Miss Grand Malaysia 2021	Selangor – Lishallinny Kanaran
The Miss Globe Malaysia 2021	Johor – Malveen Kaur
Miss Intercontinental Malaysia 2021	Kuala Lumpur – Poorani Rajoo
Top 5 finalists	Sabah – Anya Kimberly; Sarawak – Kelly Raywyn Cahill
Top 10 finalists	Kuala Lumpur – Lindsey Yap Li See; Kuala Lumpur – Vinthiya Vasu; Malacca – Pretty Tey Pei Ling; Sabah – Dewi Natasha; Sarawak – Elvieka Chrissy

== Candidates ==
Twenty-three candidates from six states and federal territory competed for the title of Miss Grand Malaysia 2021.

Team Selangor (6)		Team Kuala Lumpur (5)
Former 2020 finalists	Lishallinny Kanaran; Mellanie Yew Hoe Yan; Meagala Kanesh; Giselle Tay; Kimberly Soh Jing Hui; Sarah Cynthia	Former 2020 finalists	Gurpreet Reeta Kaur; Lindsey Yap Li See; Poorani Rajoo; Vinthiya Vasu; Melissa Aurellia (withdrew)
Former 2020 finalists	Lishallinny Kanaran; Mellanie Yew Hoe Yan; Meagala Kanesh; Giselle Tay; Kimberly Soh Jing Hui; Sarah Cynthia	Central wild card	Teo Hui Xing
blank
Team Sabah (4)		Team Sarawak (4)
State winner	Chellyana Tensu	State winner	Elvieka Chrissy
State runner-up	Dewi Natasha	State runner-up	Hannah Musa
State wild card	Anya Kimberly	Central wild card	Angela Kon; Kelly Raywyn Cahill
Central wild card	Marvena Jitol	Central wild card	Angela Kon; Kelly Raywyn Cahill
blank
Team Johor (3)		Team Malacca (1)
Former 2020 finalists	Malveen Kaur; Venus Xabelle Iyn; Esther Tan Yu Xing
Former 2020 finalists	Malveen Kaur; Venus Xabelle Iyn; Esther Tan Yu Xing	Former 2020 finalists	Pretty Tey Pei Ling
Former 2020 finalists	Malveen Kaur; Venus Xabelle Iyn; Esther Tan Yu Xing	blank
Former 2020 finalists	Malveen Kaur; Venus Xabelle Iyn; Esther Tan Yu Xing	blank
blank
