= Miss Grand Selangor =

State-level pageant in Malaysia

Miss Grand ฺSelangor
- Formation: February 24, 2019; 7 years ago
- Founder: Samuel
- Type: Beauty pageant
- Headquarters: Selangor
- Location: Malaysia
- Members: Miss Grand Malaysia
- Official language: English; Malay
- State director: Samuel (2019); Kingsley Tham (2020–2021)

Miss Grand Selangor is a Malaysian state-level beauty pageant which selects representatives from Selangor for the Miss Grand Malaysia national competition, founded in 2019 by a Kuala Lumpur-based event organizer, Samuel.

Since the first competition in the Miss Grand Malaysia pageant, Selangor's representative won the main title once; in 2021, won by a model Lishallinny Kanaran.

== History ==
The first state pageant of Miss Grand Malaysia in Selangor was held in 2019 after the license was granted to a Kuala Lumpur-based organizer, Samuel. The contest consisted of fourteen finalists who were determined through audition rounds and the final contest happened on February 24, 2019, at Empire Hotel in Subang Jaya, where a 21-year-old university student from Shah Alam, Haaraneei Muthu Kumar, was named the first Miss Grand Selangor.

The competition license was transferred to another organizer, Kingsley Tham, the following year. However, the pageant was halted in 2022 after the national license of Miss Grand Malaysia was transferred to Sean Wong of HyperLive Entertainment Pte. Ltd., and the state franchise has not been distributed since then.

Winner gallery

== Editions ==
The following table details Miss Grand Selangor's annual editions since 2019.

Edition	Date	Final venue	Entrants	Winner	Ref.
1st	February 24, 2019	Empire Hotel, Subang Jaya	14	Haaraneei Muthu Kumar	
2nd	July 25, 2020	Malaysia Tourism Centre (MaTiC), Kuala Lumpur	10	Lishallinny Kanaran	

== National competition ==
The following is a list of candidates who competed at the Miss Grand Malaysia pageant under the state organization of Miss Grand Selangor.

Color keys

For qualification procedure:	For national placement:
W State winner	Winner
R State runner-up	Runner-up
S State wildcard	Semi-finalists
C Central wildcard	Quarter-finalists

Year	Representative	Original state title	Placement at Miss Grand Malaysia	State director(s)	Ref.
2019	W Haaraneei Muthu Kumar	Miss Grand Selangor 2019	2nd runner-up	Samuel	
2019	R Simona Boonratana	1st runner-up Miss Grand Selangor 2019	Top 12	Samuel	
2020	W Lishallinny Kanaran	Miss Grand Selangor 2020	Top 7	Kingsley Tham	
2020	R Mellanie Yew Hoe Yan	1st runner-up Miss Grand Selangor 2020	Unplaced	Kingsley Tham	
2020	G Meagala Kanesh	Miss Grand Selangor 2020 Finalist	Unplaced	Kingsley Tham	
2021	W Lishallinny Kanaran	Miss Grand Selangor 2020	Winner	Kingsley Tham	
2021	R Mellanie Yew Hoe Yan	1st runner-up Miss Grand Selangor 2020	Unplaced	Kingsley Tham	
2021	G Meagala Kanesh	Miss Grand Selangor 2020 Finalist	Unplaced	Kingsley Tham	
