= Miss Grand Sarawak =

State-level pageant in Sarawak, Malaysia

Miss Grand ฺSarawak
- Formation: May 20, 2017; 9 years ago
- Founder: Borneo Pageantry
- Type: Beauty pageant
- Headquarters: Kuching
- Location: Sarawak, Malaysia
- Members: Miss Grand Malaysia
- Official language: English; Malay
- Director: Aldrin Grame (2026)
- Parent organization: Borneo Pageantry (2017); Bachelor of Malaysia/ Sarawak Paperbeads (2018–2021)

Miss Grand Sarawak is a Malaysian state-level beauty pageant which selects representatives from Sarawak for the Miss Grand Malaysia national competition, founded in 2017 by a group of event organizer based in Kuching called Borneo Pageantry.

Since the first competition in the Miss Grand Malaysia pageant, Sarawak's representative has won the national title once in 2025 by Viviana Lin Winston.

== History ==
In 2017, following the acquisition of the national license for Miss Grand Malaysia by Jude Benjamin Lisa, a franchising model was introduced for the administration of state-level competitions. Under this framework, individual organizers were granted state franchises and entrusted with the responsibility of selecting representatives to compete at the national pageant.

Within this structure, the Sarawak franchise was awarded to Borneo Pageantry, which organized the inaugural edition of Miss Grand Sarawak in Kuching. At this first state competition, Fiollaa Redup, a 24-year-old Bidayuh from Kuching, was crowned the titleholder. She subsequently advanced to the national stage, competing in the Miss Grand Malaysia 2017 pageant held in Selangor, where she was named second runner-up.

Subsequently, in 2018, the Sarawak state license was transferred to Bachelor of Malaysia/Sarawak Paperbeads. Under this new administration, the authority to nominate candidates for the state pageant was delegated to division-level organizers, resulting in the organization of twelve division-level competitions across Sarawak.

The aforementioned administrative arrangement remained in place until 2022, when the state pageant ceased operations following the transfer of the national Miss Grand Malaysia license to Sean Wong of HyperLive Entertainment Pte. Ltd. The Sarawak franchise was not reassigned thereafter and remained undistributed until 2026, when it was granted to Aldrin Grame.

== Editions ==
The following table details Miss Grand Sarawak's annual editions since 2017.

Edition	Date	Final venue	Entrants	Winner	Ref.
1st	20 May 2017	Penview Convention Centre, Kuching	16	Fiollaa Redup	
2nd	31 March 2018	RH Hotel, Sibu	18	Theresa Lieyshar Seri	
3rd	30 March 2019	Kingwood Hotel, Sibu	15	Julie Minele Senele	
4th	7 March 2021	Virtual pageant	10	Elvieka Chrissy	
5th	20 May 2026	Boulevard Shopping Mall, Miri	14	Gracelyn Tigang	

== National competition ==
The following is a list of candidates who competed at the Miss Grand Malaysia pageant under the state organization of Miss Grand Sarawak and independent contestants who qualified through the central wildcard system.

Color keys

For qualification procedure:	For national placement:
W State winner	Winner
R State runner-up	Runner-up
S State wildcard	Semi-finalists
C Central wildcard	Quarter-finalists
A Appointed

Year	Representative	Original state title	Placement at Miss Grand Malaysia	State director(s)	Ref.
2017	W Fiollaa Redup	Miss Grand Sarawak 2017	2nd runner-up	Borneo Pageantry	
2017	R Bibiana Green	1st runner-up Miss Grand Sarawak 2017	Unplaced	Borneo Pageantry	
2017	C Phrisillia Peter	—N/a	Unplaced	Independent contestant	
2018	W Theresa Lieyshar Seri	Miss Grand Sarawak 2018	Unplaced	Apohrozy Ezrie Eallie; Teresa Suli Noel; Adina Sana; Sharon Frederick	
2018	R Rachel Chin Jia Ning	1st runner-up Miss Grand Sarawak 2018	4th runner-up	Apohrozy Ezrie Eallie; Teresa Suli Noel; Adina Sana; Sharon Frederick	
2018	S Caithlin Supang	Miss Grand Sarawak 2018 Finalist	Top 12	Apohrozy Ezrie Eallie; Teresa Suli Noel; Adina Sana; Sharon Frederick	
2018	S Ellna Jiway	Miss Grand Sarawak 2018 Finalist	Top 12	Apohrozy Ezrie Eallie; Teresa Suli Noel; Adina Sana; Sharon Frederick	
2018	S Maydinia Mino	Miss Grand Sarawak 2018 Finalist	Unplaced	Apohrozy Ezrie Eallie; Teresa Suli Noel; Adina Sana; Sharon Frederick	
2019	W Julie Minele Senele	Miss Grand Sarawak 2019	Top 5	Apohrozy Ezrie Eallie; Teresa Suli Noel; Adina Sana; Sharon Frederick	
2019	R Lysandra Gabriel Storie	1st runner-up Miss Grand Sarawak 2019	Top 12	Apohrozy Ezrie Eallie; Teresa Suli Noel; Adina Sana; Sharon Frederick	
2019	S Adriana Liun David	Miss Grand Sarawak 2019 Finalist	Unplaced	Apohrozy Ezrie Eallie; Teresa Suli Noel; Adina Sana; Sharon Frederick	
2019	S Gloria Kelbin	Miss Grand Sarawak 2019 Finalist	Unplaced	Apohrozy Ezrie Eallie; Teresa Suli Noel; Adina Sana; Sharon Frederick	
2019	C Emily Elizabeth Beard	—N/a	Top 12	Independent contestants	
2019	C Emily Chieng Dee Ling	—N/a	Top 12	Independent contestants	
2020	S Angela Kon	Miss Grand Sarawak 2020/21 Finalist	Unplaced	Apohrozy Ezrie Eallie; Teresa Suli Noel; Adina Sana; Sharon Frederick	
2020	S Kelly Raywyn Cahill	Miss Grand Sarawak 2020/21 Finalist	Unplaced	Apohrozy Ezrie Eallie; Teresa Suli Noel; Adina Sana; Sharon Frederick	
2021	W Elvieka Chrissy	Miss Grand Sarawak 2020/21	Top 10	Apohrozy Ezrie Eallie; Teresa Suli Noel; Adina Sana; Sharon Frederick	
2021	R Hannah Musa	1st runner-up Miss Grand Sarawak 2020/21	Unplaced	Apohrozy Ezrie Eallie; Teresa Suli Noel; Adina Sana; Sharon Frederick	
2021	S Kelly Raywyn Cahill	Miss Grand Sarawak 2020/21 Finalist	Top 5	Apohrozy Ezrie Eallie; Teresa Suli Noel; Adina Sana; Sharon Frederick	
2021	S Angela Kon	Miss Grand Sarawak 2020/21 Finalist	Unplaced	Apohrozy Ezrie Eallie; Teresa Suli Noel; Adina Sana; Sharon Frederick	
2025	A Viviana Lin Winston	Appointed	Miss Grand Malaysia 2025	Independent contestant	
2026	W Gracelyn Tigang	Miss Grand Sarawak 2026	TBA	Aldrin Grame	
