= Miss Grand Malaysia 2022 =

7th Miss Grand Malaysia competition, beauty pageant edition

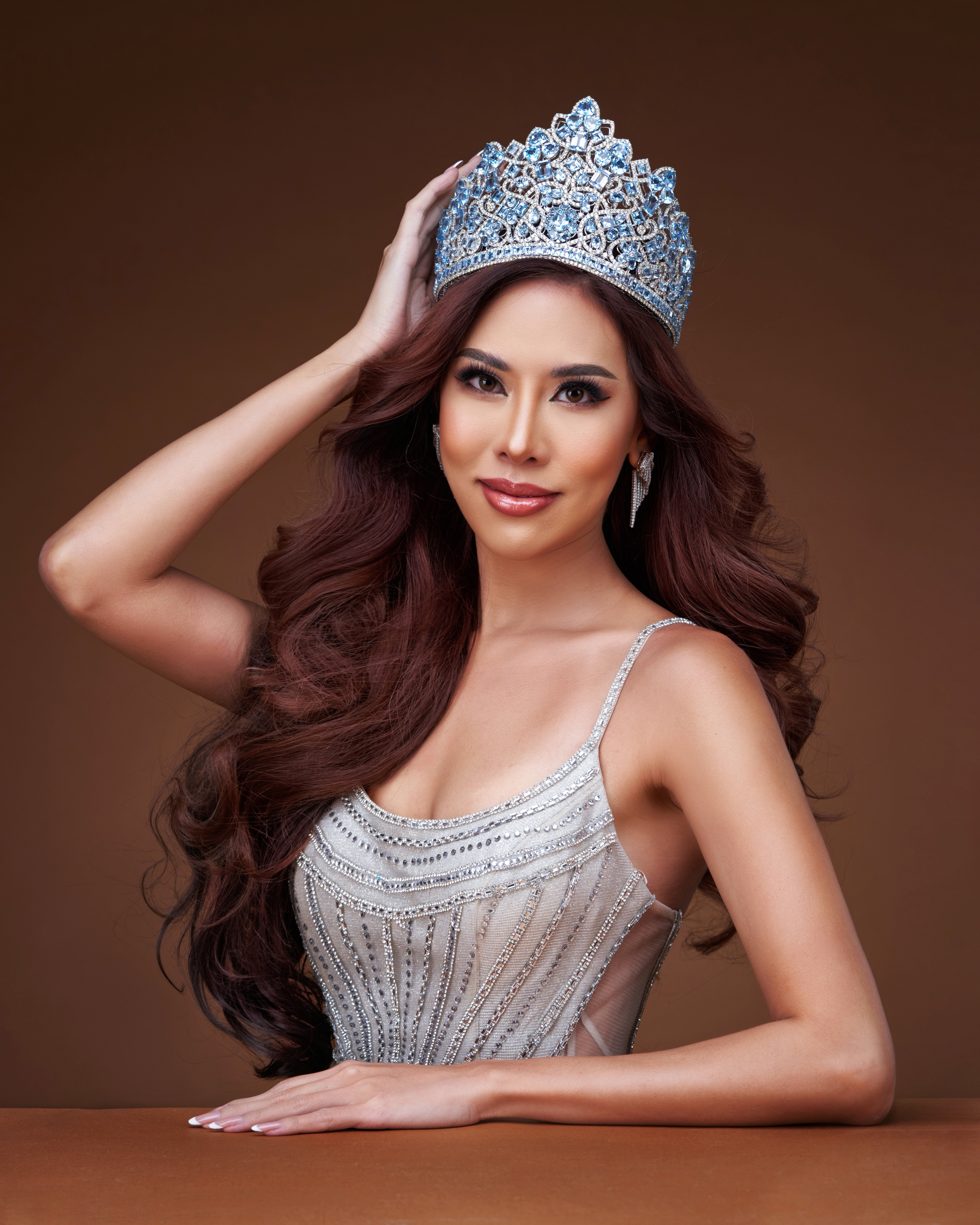
- Charissa Chong, the winner of the contest
- Date: August 27, 2022
- Venue: Sabah International Convention Centre, Kota Kinabalu, Sabah
- Broadcaster: YouTube
- Entrants: 15
- Placements: 5
- Winner: Charissa Chong (Selangor)

Miss Grand Malaysia 2022 was the seventh edition of the Miss Grand Malaysia pageant, held at the Sabah International Convention Centre, Kota Kinabalu, Sabah, on August 27, 2022. Seven candidates, who qualified for the national stage through an audition performed earlier in June, competed for the title. Of whom a 27-year-old Malaysian-Chinese model and content creator from Selangor, Charissa Chong, was named the winner, while Vivienna Alfred from Sarawak and Angela Quah from Johor Bahru were announced the first and second runners-up, respectively. Charissa later represented the country at the international parent edition, Miss Grand International 2022, held in Indonesia on October 25, but she was unplaced.

The event was held in parallel with the Miss World Malaysia 2022 and Miss Supranational Malaysia 2023 pageants, which is the first time three main-stream beauty pageants were held at the same time in Sabah. Some of the contestants were vying for more than one titles. The grand gala final of the pageant was also attended by Miss Grand International 2021, Nguyễn Thúc Thùy Tiên of Vietnam, as well as the directors of its international parent contest, Nawat Itsaragrisil and Teresa Chaivisut.

The pageant was held as part of the HyperLive Festival Malaysia, which was supported by the Sabah Tourism, Culture, and Environment Ministry, Sabah Tourism Board, Kota Kinabalu City Hall, and the Malaysian International Chamber of Commerce and Industry (MICCI), and was considered the first edition of Miss Grand Malaysia held by Sean Wong after he took over the license from a Kuala Lumpur-based event organizer, Introducing Talent Sdn Bhd, in late 2021.

The following list is the candidates who competed for the title of Miss Grand Malaysia 2022.

- Angela Quah (2nd runner-up)
- Anya Kimberly Kow
- Archana Ganesan
- Charissa Chong (Winner)
- Clera Pungi
- Einthumathi Ulaganathan
- Febe Rachel Sabtuh (Top 5)
- Helen Chong Yi Xin
- Jade Park
- Linasni Kusraju
- Manjula Tamara
- Nancy Tor (Top 5)
- Verollia Ho Li Len
- Vivienna Alfred (1st runner-up)
- Yaw Mee Mee
