= PacifiCity =

Building in Kota Kinabalu, Sabah, Malaysia

PACIFICITY

General information
- Status: Under construction
- Location: Sabah, Likas, Kota Kinabalu, Malaysia
- Estimated completion: 2023
- Owner: Pacific Sanctuary Holdings Sdn Bhd

Website
- www.pacificity.com

PACIFICITY is an integrated development located in the area of Likas, Kota Kinabalu, Sabah, Malaysia featuring residences, offices, hotels and a shopping mall. PACIFICITY is accessible from 3 surrounding roads connected by 6-entry and exit points and 15 mins to Kota Kinabalu International Airport. The previous estimated completion date for this project is on 2018, but then postponed to 2023.
