= Miss Grand Kuala Lumpur =

State-level pageant in Malaysia

Miss Grand ฺKuala Lumpur
- Formation: July 15, 2017; 9 years ago
- Founder: Meris Waldorf
- Type: Beauty pageant
- Headquarters: Kuala Lumpur
- Location: Malaysia
- Members: Miss Grand Malaysia
- Official language: English; Malay
- State director: Meris Waldorf (2017); Jacqueline Liwanag Malabuyoc (2018–2019); Rosalinda Talip (2020–2021)

Miss Grand Kuala Lumpur is a Malaysian state-level beauty pageant which selects representatives from Kuala Lumpur to the Miss Grand Malaysia national competition, founded in 2017 by a Kuala Lumpur-based entrepreneur, Meris Waldorf of Me Rich Sdn Bhd.

Since the first competition in the Miss Grand Malaysia pageant, Kuala Lumpur's representatives have never won the competition three times but were named runners-up in 2017 and 2018, as well as won the supplemental title of Miss Intercontinental Malaysia in 2021.

== History ==
After acquiring the license of Miss Grand Malaysia in 2017, Jude Benjamin Lisa began franchising the state competitions to individual organizers, who would name the state representatives to compete in the national pageant, the license for Kuala Lumpur was granted to a Kuala Lumpur-based entrepreneur, Meris Waldorf of Me Rich Sdn Bhd, who then organized the first contest of Miss Grand Kuala Lumpur on July 15, 2017, at the Panggung Anniversari, Kuala Lumpur, in which a 19-year-old dentistry student, Parveen Sidhu, was named the first Miss Grand Kuala Lumpur.

The competition license was transferred to Jacqueline Liwanag Malabuyoc and Rosalinda Talip in 2018 and 2020, respectively. It was halted in 2022 after the national license of Miss Grand Malaysia was transferred to Sean Wong of HyperLive Entertainment Pte. Ltd., and the state franchise has not been distributed since then.

== Editions ==
The following table details Miss Grand Kuala Lumpur's annual editions since 2017.

| Edition | Date | Final venue | Entrants | Winner | Ref. |
|---|---|---|---|---|---|
| 1st | July 15, 2017 | Panggung Anniversari, Kuala Lumpur | 16 | Parveen Sidhu | |
| 2nd | April 6, 2018 | Palace Of The Golden Horses Hotel, Seri Kembangan | 16 | Taanusiya Veerapandian | |
| 3rd | March 9, 2019 | Evolve Concept Mall, Petaling Jaya | 16 | Kishweni Jaganathan | |
| 4th | March 15, 2020 | Swiss-Garden Hotel Bukit Bintang, Kuala Lumpur | 14 | Melissa Aurellia | |

== National competition ==
The following is a list of candidates who competed at the Miss Grand Malaysia pageant under the state organization of Miss Grand Kuala Lumpur.

Color keys

| For qualification procedure: | For national placement: |
| W State winner | Winner |
| R State runner-up | Runner-up |
| S State wildcard | Semi-finalists |
| C Central wildcard | Quarter-finalists |

| Year | Representative | Original state title | Placement at Miss Grand Malaysia | State director | Ref. |
|---|---|---|---|---|---|
| 2017 | W Parveen Sidhu | Miss Grand Kuala Lumpur 2017 | Top 7 | Meris Waldorf | |
| 2017 | W Cass Chen | Miss Intercontinental Kuala Lumpur 2017 | 1st runner-up | Meris Waldorf | |
| 2017 | R Maria Devonne Escobia | 1st runner-up Miss Grand Kuala Lumpur 2017 | Top 7 | Meris Waldorf | |
| 2017 | R Shireen Kaur Oklih | 2nd runner-up Miss Grand Kuala Lumpur 2017 | Unplaced | Meris Waldorf | |
| 2017 | R Samira Siadatan | 3rd runner-up Miss Grand Kuala Lumpur 2017 | Unplaced | Meris Waldorf | |
| 2017 | S Rachell Ho | Miss Grand Kuala Lumpur 2017 Finalist | Unplaced | Meris Waldorf | |
| 2018 | W Taanusiya Veerapandian | Miss Grand Kuala Lumpur 2018 | 3rd runner-up | Jacqueline L. Malabuyoc | |
| 2018 | R Audrey Wong | 1st runner-up Miss Grand Kuala Lumpur 2018 | Unplaced | Jacqueline L. Malabuyoc | |
| 2018 | R Erma Masilla Kotiu | 2nd runner-up Miss Grand Kuala Lumpur 2018 | Unplaced | Jacqueline L. Malabuyoc | |
| 2018 | S Nanthini Nadarajah | Miss Grand Kuala Lumpur 2018 Finalist | Top 12 | Jacqueline L. Malabuyoc | |
| 2018 | S Sivasakti Alexander | Miss Grand Kuala Lumpur 2018 Finalist | Unplaced | Jacqueline L. Malabuyoc | |
| 2018 | S Kai Chin | Miss Grand Kuala Lumpur 2018 Finalist | Top 12 | Jacqueline L. Malabuyoc | |
| 2019 | W Kishweni Jaganathan | Miss Grand Kuala Lumpur 2019 | Top 12 | Jacqueline L. Malabuyoc | |
| 2019 | R Chermaine Kang Yi Ting | 1st runner-up Miss Grand Kuala Lumpur 2019 | Unplaced | Jacqueline L. Malabuyoc | |
| 2020 | W Melissa Aurellia | Miss Grand Kuala Lumpur 2020 | Unplaced | Rosalinda Talip | |
| 2020 | R Poorani Rajoo | 1st runner-up Miss Grand Kuala Lumpur 2020 | Unplaced | Rosalinda Talip | |
| 2020 | R Vinthiya Vasu | 2nd runner-up Miss Grand Kuala Lumpur 2020 | Unplaced | Rosalinda Talip | |
| 2020 | S Gurpreet Reeta Kaur | Miss Grand Kuala Lumpur 2020 Finalist | Unplaced | Rosalinda Talip | |
| 2020 | S Lindsey Yap Li See | Miss Grand Kuala Lumpur 2020 Finalist | Unplaced | Rosalinda Talip | |
| 2021 | W Melissa Aurellia | Miss Grand Kuala Lumpur 2020 | Withdrew | Rosalinda Talip | |
| 2021 | R Poorani Rajoo | 1st runner-up Miss Grand Kuala Lumpur 2020 | Miss Intercontinental Malaysia 2021 | Rosalinda Talip | |
| 2021 | R Vinthiya Vasu | 2nd runner-up Miss Grand Kuala Lumpur 2020 | Top 10 | Rosalinda Talip | |
| 2021 | S Gurpreet Reeta Kaur | Miss Grand Kuala Lumpur 2020 Finalist | Unplaced | Rosalinda Talip | |
| 2021 | S Lindsey Yap Li See | Miss Grand Kuala Lumpur 2020 Finalist | Top 10 | Rosalinda Talip | |
