= Miss Grand Malaysia =

Beauty contest

- Formation: August 29, 2013; 13 years ago
- Founder: Anson Chong
- Type: Beauty pageant
- Headquarters: Kuala Lumpur
- Location: Malaysia
- Members: Miss Grand International
- Official language: English
- National Director: Melisha Lin
- Parent organization: HyperLive Entertainment Sdn Bhd

Miss Grand Malaysia licensees timeline
Stand-alone pageant; Appointed titleholder

Miss Grand Malaysia is an annual female beauty pageant in Malaysia, aiming to select the country's representative for Miss Grand International, which is an annual international beauty pageant promoting World Peace and against all kinds of conflicts. During 2015 to 2021, the contest was run by Introducing Talent Sdn Bhd, under the leadership of Jude Benjamin Lisa. Since 2022, the franchise has belonged to the Singapore-based start-up HyperLive Entertainment.

Malaysia holds a record of 5 placements at Miss Grand International, which were obtained in 2016, 2020, 2021,, 2024, and 2025. The highest achievement was fifth runner-up won by Melisha Lin of Selangor.

The current Miss Grand Malaysia is Vyan Trisni of Selangor. She will represent her country at the Miss Grand International 2026 pageant held in Bangkok, Thailand.

== History ==
The Miss Grand Malaysia beauty contest was founded in 2013 by Penang-based businessperson Anson Chong who ran the inaugural edition at Queensbay Mall in Bayan Lepas, featuring 12 national finalists representing all Malaysia states. Of which, Michelle Madeleine Boey from the host state was announced as the winner and won the prizes worth 10,000 RM During 2014 to 2016, no national pageant held to determine the winner, the country representatives for the international competition were designated by different national directors.

After three years of hiatus, the pageant was brought back in 2017 by a public relation and digital marketing consultant from Sarawak Jude Benjamin Lisa, who served as the national licensee for Miss Grand International in Malaysia during 2015 to 2021. Together with the business partner Josh Oneill, he also set up the event organizer privately held firm Introducing Talent Sdn Bhd to be responsible for managing the affiliated pageant, beginning with the second edition of Miss Grand Malaysia, in which Sanjeda John from Sabah was named the winner at a contest held at Evolve Concept Mall in Selangor on 5 August outclassing 15 other finalists. In the same event, the country representative for Miss Interncontinental 2017 was also crowned. Since then, the pageant has been held annually to select the Malaysian candidates for various international pageants including Miss Grand International until the organization lost the franchise to the Singapore-based start-up company HyperLive Entertainment Pte Ltd in 2022. The national titleholder for Miss Grand International has been determined through the Miss World Malaysia ever since. The event was organized by Fantastic Golden Sdn. Bhd., who was appointed by the Singaporean franchise holder company as its official partner to produce the event in Malaysia.

Since 2017, the organization has been franchising the state competitions to the individual organizers, who would name the state titleholders to compete in the national pageant. Beginning with three state pageants in 2017 including Sabah, Sarawak, and Kuala Lumpur, Melaka became the fourth member in 2018, while Selangor and Johor first joined the contest in 2019 and 2020, respectively. The organizer also planned to held the seventh-state pageant in Penang in 2022, but, unfortunately, lost the franchise to HyperLive Entertainment.

Due to the COVID-19 pandemic, the pageant was virtually held for two consecutive years in 2020 and 2021. Originally, the organizer planned to conduct the 2020 physical contest at Bangi Avenue Convention Centre in late June, but postponed it twice, first to mid-October, and then to 30 January 2021. However, in early 2021, the situation of the outbreak has not improved, causing the organizer to hold the contest virtually instead, in which Jasebel Robert was chosen to participate at the Miss Grand International 2020 in Thailand, while the remainder of the candidates was qualified to compete at the 2021 national contest automatically.

== Selection of contestants ==
The Regional Pageants of Miss Grand Malaysia in 2020.
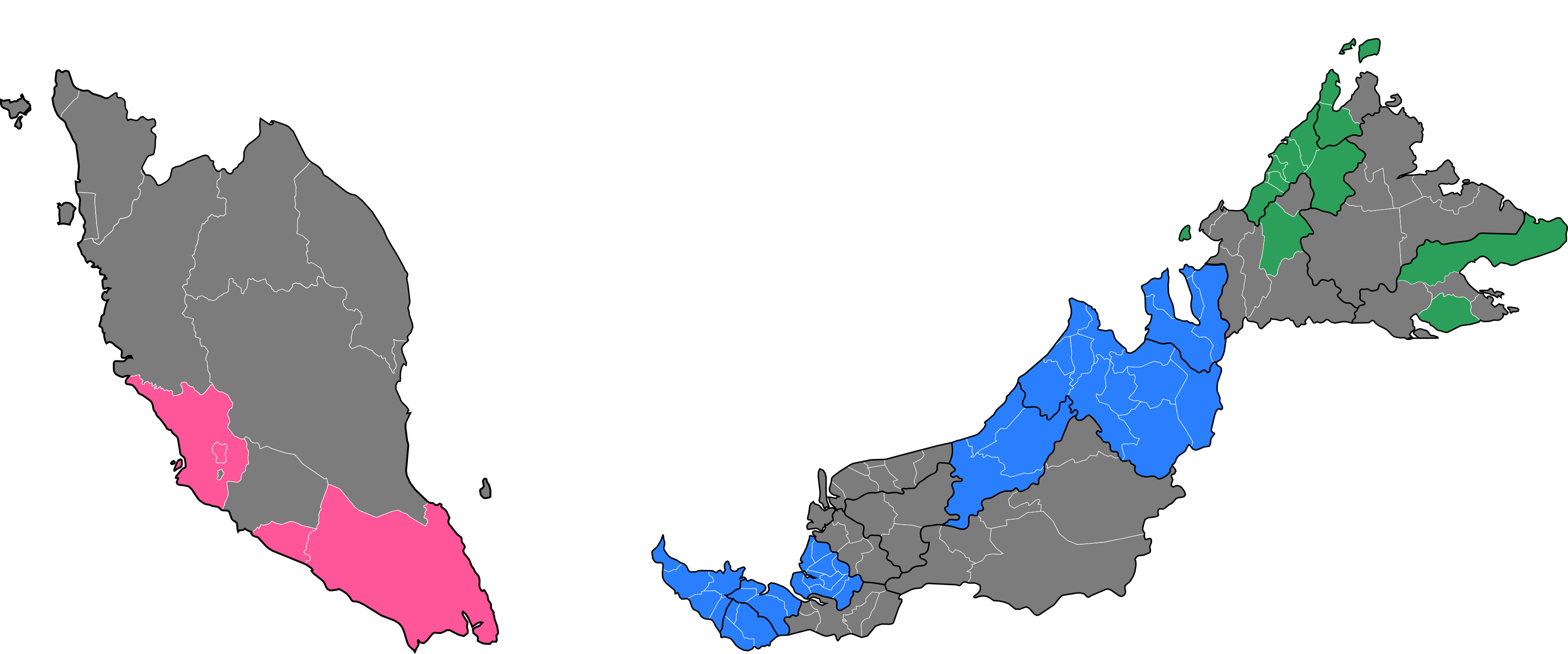
Color keys

State Pageants (6); Local Pageants in Sarawak (8); Local Pageants in Sabah (16)	• Casting event National pageant No Pageant Held

Since 2017, the national finalists' selection of the Miss Grand Malaysia has been operated via three systems, including (1) the multiplex regional pageant system, in which the state franchisee conducts several local pageants and casting events to determine the state finalists, or franchising the local competition to individual organizers, who would name their representative to compete at the state pageants. (2) a simple regional pageant system, the state pageant is held to select the national finalists with no lower pageants or casting events, and (3) a central direct application through the national licensee, the organization then selects the candidates based on their profiles.

The winner, as well as the 1-2 runners-up of each state pageant, will automatically qualify to the national stage while other runners-up and some finalists candidates will be entered to the wild card round, in which the national organizer will then select the supplementary national candidates based on their discretion.

As of 2020, six states was held the state contest for the Miss Grand Malaysia, including:

Simple state pageants

- Johor: held once in 2020.
- Kuala Lumpur: held during 2017 – 2020.
- Malacca: first held in 2018.
- Selangor: held in 2019 and 2020.

Multiplex state pageants

- Sabah: held annually since 2017, the highest number of local pageants is 16 in 2020.
- Sarawak: held annually since 2017, the highest number of local pageants is 18 in 2018.

Miss Grand Malaysia National Finalists Selection Procedure
(2017 – 2021)

Stage/System
Stage 1
Stage 2
Stage 3

Multiplex Regional (East Malaysia States)
Local Pageant (s)	Local Casting (s)
State level Pageant
Others RU & finalists
Winner & RU (2-4 spot/state)
Wild Card Challenge
National Pageant

Simple Regional (West Malaysia States)
State level Pageant
Winner & RU (1-3 spot/state)

Centrally Direct (Organizer Selection)
Profile Screening

== Editions ==
=== Location and date ===
The following list is the edition detail of the Miss Grand Malaysia contest, since its inception in 2013.

Edition	Date	Final venue	Host State	Entrants	Ref.
1st	29 September 2013	Ground floor, Central Atrium, Queensbay Mall	Penang	12	
2nd	5 August 2017	Grand Pacific Ballroom, Evolve Concept Mall, Petaling Jaya	Selangor	16	
3rd	12 May 2018	Grand Pacific Ballroom, Evolve Concept Mall, Petaling Jaya	Selangor	24	
4th	28 April 2019	Meritz Hotel, Miri	Sarawak	24	
5th	28 January 2020	The pageant was held virtually, due to the spreading of the COVID-19		17	
6th	2 August 2021	The pageant was held virtually, due to the spreading of the COVID-19		23	
7th	27 August 2022	Sabah International Convention Centre, Kota Kinabalu	Sabah	15	
8th	14 August 2023	The Zodiac Theatre, 7th floor Genting Dream Cruise	—N/a	11	
9th	22 August 2024	Galaxy Banquet Hall, HGH Convention Centre	Kuala Lumpur	12	
10th	30 July 2025	Galaxy Banquet Hall, HGH Convention Centre	Kuala Lumpur	8	
11th	23 July 2026	Confetti KL, Seri Kembangan	Selangor	12	

=== Competition result ===
Edition	Winner	Runners-up					Ref.
Edition	Winner	First	Second	Third	Fourth	Fifth	Ref.
1st	Michelle Boey (Penang)	Malena Yvelisse (Kedah)	Natelynn Tiow (Kuala Lumpur)	Not awarded			
2nd	Sanjeda John (Sabah)	Cass Chen (Putrajaya)	Fiolla Redup (Sarawak)	Not awarded			
3rd	Debra Jeanne Poh (Sabah)	Kate Cantwell (Sabah)	Scarlett Megan Liew (Sabah)	Taanusiya Veerapandian (Kuala Lumpur)	Rachel Chin (Sarawak)	Not awarded	
4th	Mel Dequanne Abar (Sabah)	Saroopdeep Kaur Bath (Perak)	Haaraneei Muthu Kumar (Selangor)	Julie Minele Senele (Sarawak)	Lishallinny Kanaran (Selangor)	Not awarded	
5th	Jasebel Robert (Kuala Lumpur)	No runners-up, the remaining delegates automatically qualified for the 2021 national contest.					
6th	Lishallinny Kanaran (Selangor)	Malveen Kaur (Johor)	Poorani Rajoo (Kuala Lumpur)	Not awarded			
7th	Charissa Chong (Selangor)	Vivienna Alfred (Sarawak)	Angela Quah (Johor)	Not awarded			
8th	Kash Bhullar (Selangor)	Natalie Ang Ai Dee (Putrajaya)	Poorani Rajoo (Kuala Lumpur)	Chai Shu Wen (Sabah)	Sisnitha Thirumaran (Negeri Sembilan)	Angela Quah (Johor)	
9th	Melisha Lin (Selangor)	Geetha William (Kuala Lumpur)	Lilyannie Christie (Sabah)	Linasni Kusraju (Selangor)	Esther Marius Tito (Sabah)	Kiki Khor (Kuala Lumpur)	
10th	Viviana Lin Winston (Sarawak)	Nisha Thayananthan (Negeri Sembilan)	Rochil Saga (Sabah)	Orange Ooi (Johor)	Fumiko Kriss (Sarawak)	Not awarded	
11th	Sunoshini Dhanabalan (Negeri Sembilan)	Vyan Trisni (Selangor)	Gracelyn Tigang (Sarawak)	Not awarded			

== International competition ==
The following is a list of Malaysian representatives competed at the Miss Grand International pageant.

Color keys

- : Declared as the winner
- : Ended as a runner-up (Top 5)
- : Ended as a finalist (Top 10)
- : Ended as a semifinalist (Top 20/21)
- : Ended as special awards winner

Year	Miss Grand Malaysia	Title	Placement	Special Awards	National Director
2027	TBA	TBA	TBA	TBA	Melisha Lin
2026	Vyan Trisni	Miss Grand Malaysia 2026	Top 25	1 Special Award: Top 40 – Country's Power of the Year Award	Melisha Lin
2025	Viviana Lin Winston	Miss Grand Malaysia 2025	Unplaced	1 Special Award: Top 20 – Country's Power of the Year Award	Sean Wong
2024	Melisha Lin	Miss Grand Malaysia 2024	5th Runner-up (Note: Originally named the top 20 finalists but was promoted to the 5th runner-up (Top 10) following the resignation and dethronement of several top 5 finalists.)	4 Special Award: Top 10 – Best in National Costume; Top 15 – Grand Voice Award; Top 16 – Country Power's of the Year Award; Top 20 – Best in Swimsuit	Sean Wong
2023	Kash Bhullar	Miss Grand Malaysia 2023	Unplaced		Sean Wong
2022	Charissa Chong	Miss Grand Malaysia 2022	Unplaced		Sean Wong
2021	Lishallinny Kanaran	Miss Grand Malaysia 2021	Top 20	1 Special Award: Best National Costume	Jude Benjamin Lisa
2020	Jasebel Robert	Miss Grand Malaysia 2020	Top 10	1 Special Award: Miss Popular Vote	Jude Benjamin Lisa
2019	Mel Dequanne Abar	Miss Grand Malaysia 2019	Unplaced		Jude Benjamin Lisa
2018	Debra Jeanne Poh	Miss Grand Malaysia 2018	Unplaced		Jude Benjamin Lisa
2017	Sanjeda John	Miss Grand Malaysia 2017	Unplaced		Jude Benjamin Lisa
2016	Ranmeet Jassal	Appointed	Top 20		Jude Benjamin Lisa
2015	Santhawan Boonratana	Appointed	Unplaced		Invited
2014	Jane Koo Wai Kuan	Appointed	Unplaced		Anson Chong
2013	Michelle Boey	Miss Grand Malaysia 2013	Unplaced		Anson Chong

== Winner gallery ==
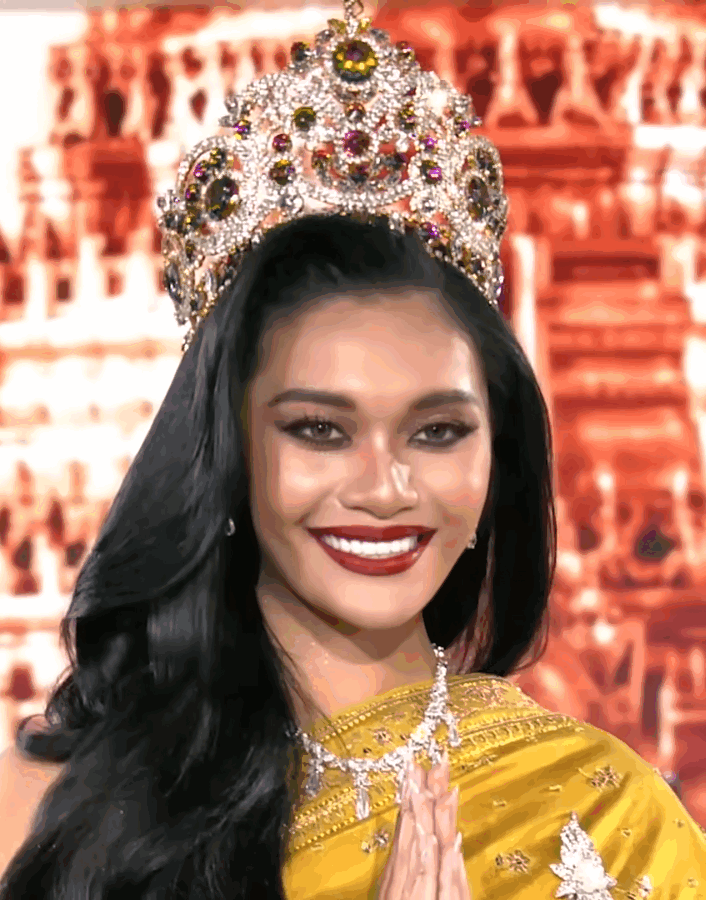
Viviana Lin Winston (2025)

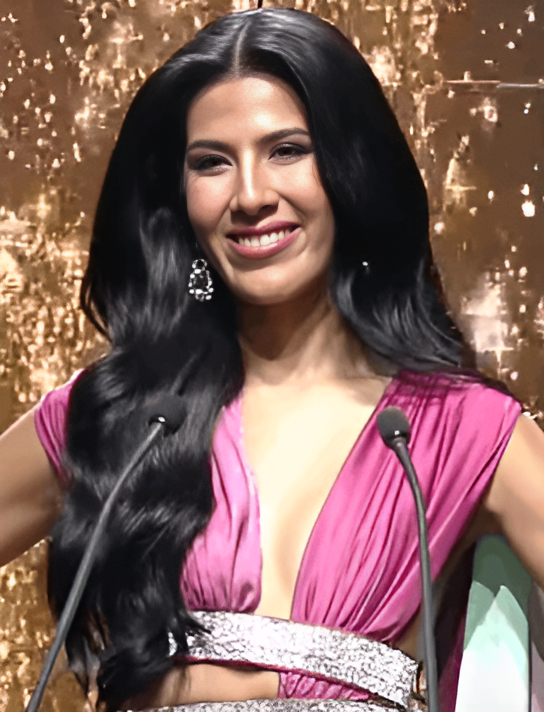
Melisha Lin (2024)

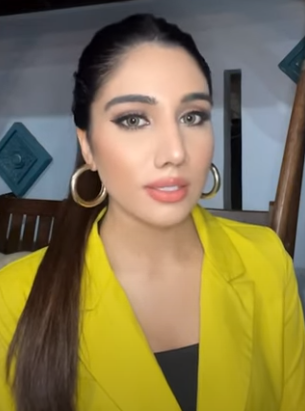
Kash Bhullar (2023)

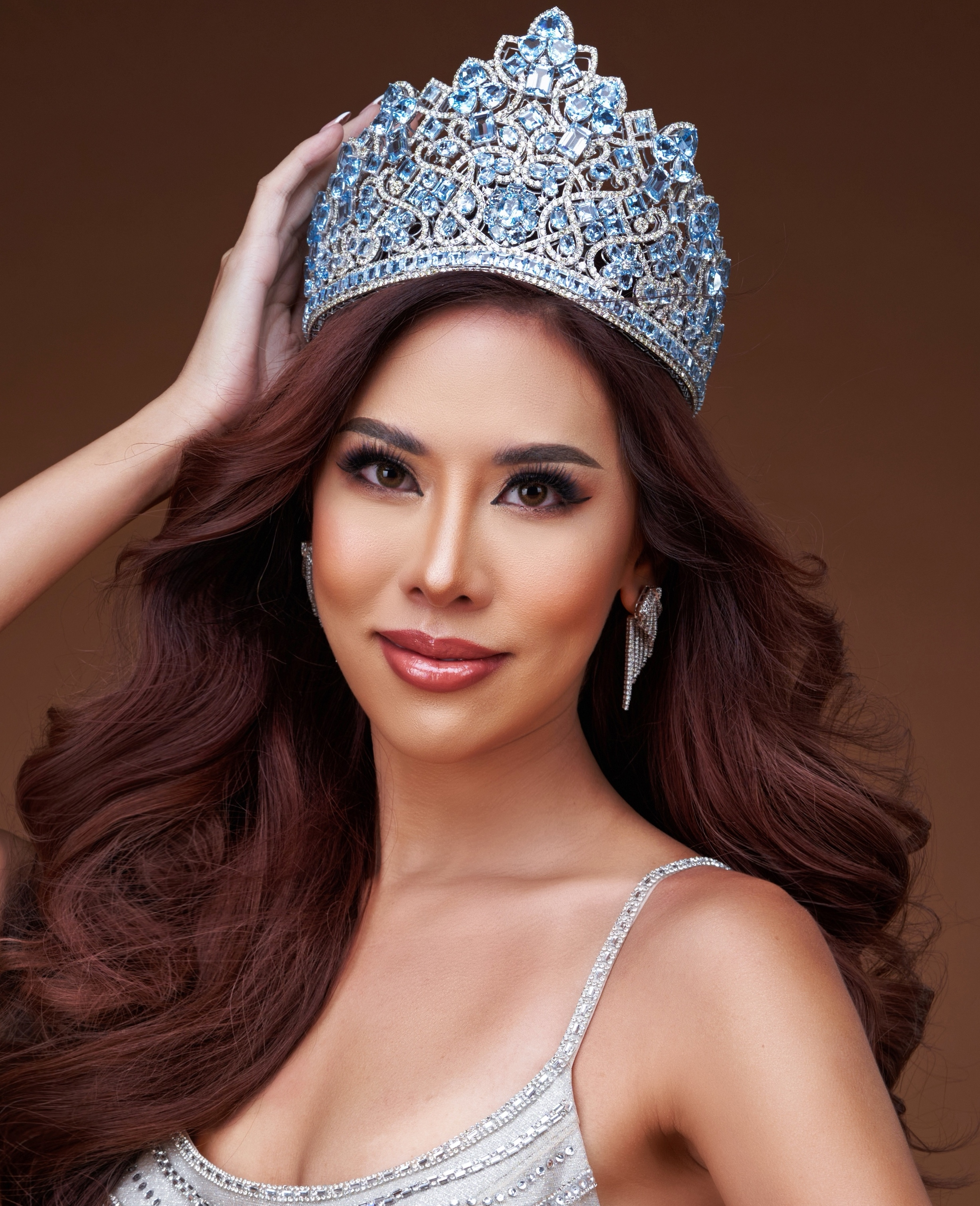
Charissa Chong (2022)

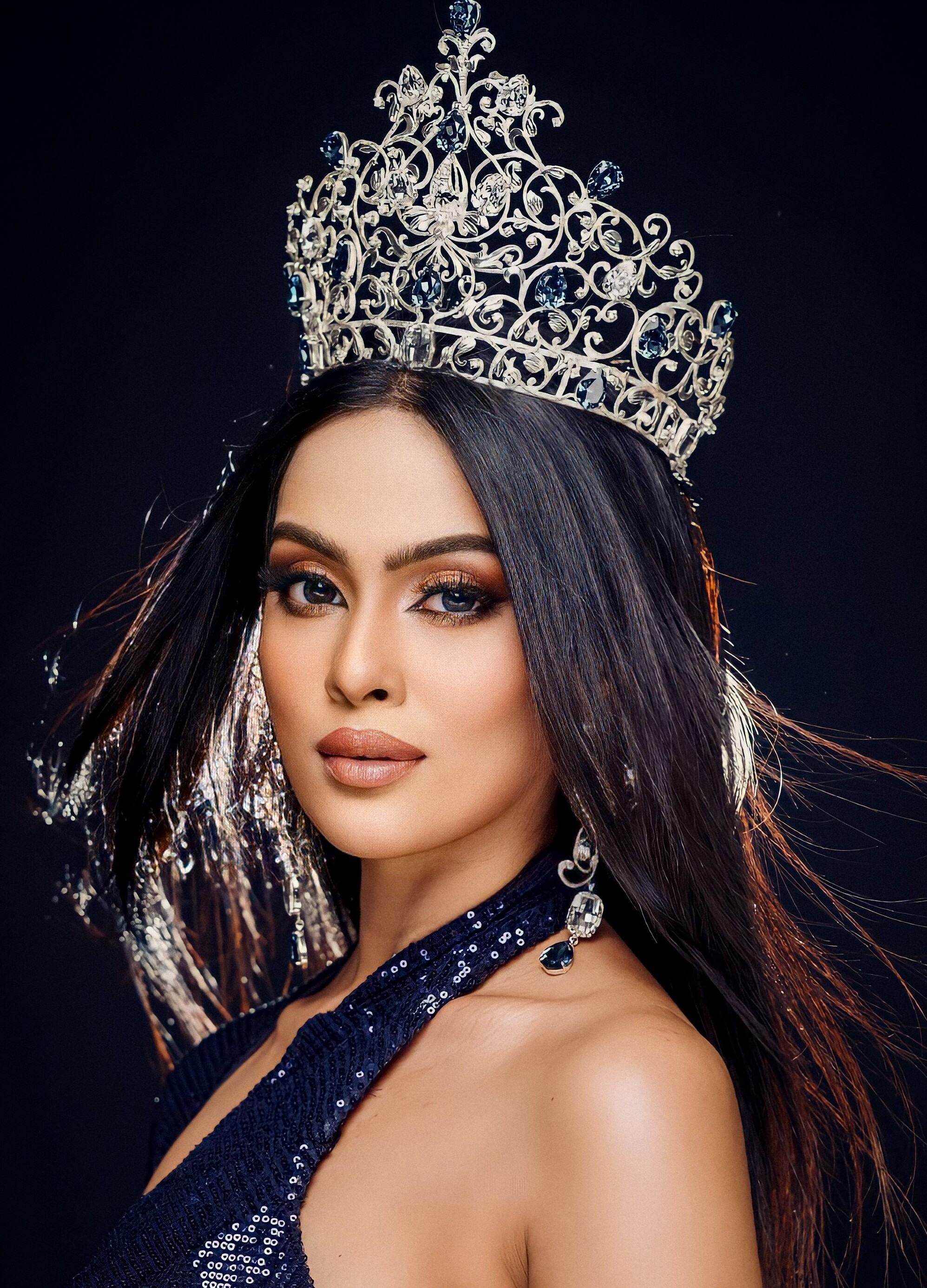
Lishalliny Kanaran (2021)

== See also ==
- Miss Grand International
- Miss Grand Kuala Lumpur
- Miss Grand Sabah
- Miss Grand Sarawak
- Miss Grand Selangor
