= Miss Grand Malaysia 2023 =

8th Miss Grand Malaysia competition, beauty pageant edition

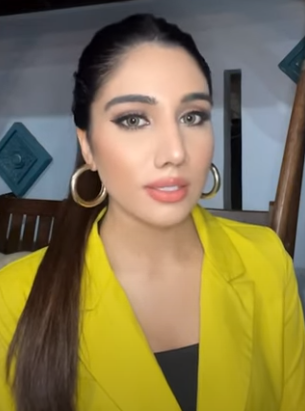
- Kash Bhullar, the winner of the contest
- Date: August 14, 2023
- Venue: Zodiac Theatre, 7th floor Genting Dream Cruise
- Broadcaster: YouTube
- Entrants: 11
- Placements: 6
- Winner: Kash Bhullar (Selangor)
- People’s Choice: Kash Bhullar (Selangor)

Miss Grand Malaysia 2023 was the eighth edition of the Miss Grand Malaysia pageant, held on August 14, 2023, in the Zodiac Theatre on the 7th floor of the Genting Dream Cruise. Eleven candidates competed for the title, of whom a 21-year-old actress and model from Selangor, Kash Bhullar, was announced the winner and won the prize of RM15,000 in cash and jewelry worth RM 25,000. Kash later represented the country at the Miss Grand International 2023 pageant, held in Vietnam on October 25 of that year, but she was unplaced.

The application for the pageant was open virtually in June 2023, and then the submitted delegate's documents were screened to elect the qualifiers for an online audition arranged later in July, where the final 11 candidates were chosen. The press conference of the contest was held on July 24 on the Genting Dream Cruise.

The contest was the second edition of Miss Grand Malaysia organized by a businessperson, Sean Wong, after acquiring the license in 2022. The grand final event of the pageant was also attended by Miss Grand International 2022, Isabella Menin of Brazil, as well as vice president of the Miss Grand International, Teresa Chaivisut.

== Result ==
Miss Grand Malaysia 2023 competition result
Color key:
Winner	4th runner-up
1st runner-up	5th runner-up
2nd runner-up	Unplaced
3rd runner-up	No representative

Position	Delegate
Miss Grand Malaysia 2023	Selangor – Kash Bhullar
1st runner-up	Putrajaya – Natalie Ang
2nd runner-up	Kuala Lumpur – Poorani Rajoo
3rd runner-up	Sabah – Chai Shu Wen
4th runner-up	Negeri Sembilan – Sisnitha Thirumaran
5th runner-up	Johor – Angela Quah

== Contestants ==
Eleven candidates competed for the title.

- Johor – Angela Quah
- Kuala Lumpur – Poorani Rajoo
- Labuan – Jadlyn Michelle
- Malacca – Priya Dee Kay
- Negeri Sembilan – Sisnitha Thirumaran
- Penang – Cindy Ng
- Perak – Rebecca Shalom
- Putrajaya – Natalie Ang
- Sabah – Chai Shu Wen
- Sarawak – Clera Pungi
- Selangor – Kash Bhullar
