= Miss Grand Malaysia 2017 =

2nd Miss Grand Malaysia pageant

- Date: August 4, 2017
- Presenters: Nigel Chin; Brynn Lovett
- Venue: Grand Pacific Ballroom, Evolve Concept Mall, Petaling Jaya
- Broadcaster: YouTube
- Entrants: 16
- Placements: 7
- Winner: Sanjeda John (Sabah)

Miss Grand Malaysia 2017 was the second edition of the Miss Grand Malaysia pageant, held on August 4, 2017, in the Grand Pacific Ballroom, Evolve Concept Mall, Petaling Jaya, Selangor. Sixteen candidates, who qualified for the national stage through the state pageant or national audition, competed for the title.

At the end of the event, a 25-year-old biomedical science student representing Sabah, Sanjeda John, was announced the winner. Sanjeda later represented Malaysia in the international parent stage, Miss Grand International 2017, held in October that year in Vietnam, but she was unplaced. Meanwhile, the representative of Kuala Lumpur, Sanjna Suri, won the supplemental title of Miss Intercontinental Malaysia 2017, and was placed among the top 18 finalists after competing internationally in Egypt.

The event was hosted by celebrities Nigel Chin and Brynn Lovett, and was also attended by Miss Grand International's president Nawat Itsaragrisil as well as Miss Grand International 2016 Ariska Putri Pertiwi of Indonesia.

== Selection of contestants ==
=== Overview ===
The national finalists for the Miss Grand Malaysia 2017 pageant were determined through three selection systems: the 3 automatic spots were given to the respective state pageant winners (Sabah, Sarawak, and Kuala Lumpur) while the remaining 13 were pre-determined from either the state pageant finalists or the nationwide audition roadshow in Penang, Perak, Melaka, and Johor.

=== Regional pageants ===
Out of sixteen states and federal territories of Malaysia, only three held the regional preliminary pageants for Miss Grand Malaysia 2017, including, Kuala Lumpur, Sabah, and Sarawak. In addition to the state winners, some state runners-up or finalists also qualified for the national stage.

The details of Miss Grand Malaysia 2017's state-level pageants are detailed below.

List of the state preliminary contest of Miss Grand Malaysia 2017
Pageant	Date and venue	Entrants	National qualifier(s)	Ref.
Miss Grand Sarawak	May 20, 2017, at the Penview Convention Centre, Kuching	16	2	
Miss Grand Sabah	April 30, 2017, at the Pacific Sutera Hotel, Kota Kinabalu	14	2	
Miss Grand Kuala Lumpur	July 15, 2017, at the Panggung Anniversari, Kuala Lumpur	16	6	

== Result ==
Miss Grand Malaysia 2017 competition result
Color key:
Winner	Top 7
1st runner-up	Unplaced
2nd runner-up	Did not compete

Position	Delegate
Miss Grand Malaysia 2017	Sabah – Sanjeda John
Miss Intercontinental Malaysia 2017	Kuala Lumpur – Sanjna Suri
1st runner-up	Putrajaya – Cass Chen
2nd runner-up	Sarawak – Fiollaa Redup
Top 7	Johor – Parveen Sidhu; Kelantan – Maria Devonne Escobia; Labuan – Felcy Fransie
Special awards
Best in Swimwear	Sabah – Sanjeda John
Miss Popularity	Sarawak – Fiollaa Redup

== Contestants ==
Sixteen contestants competed for the title.

- Johor – Parveen Sidhu
- Kedah – Shireen Kaur
- Kelantan – Maria Devonne Escobia
- Kuala Lumpur – Sanjna Suri
- Labuan – Felcy Fransie
- Malacca – Mithrra Kuladeva
- Negeri Sembilan – Rachell Ho
- Pahang – Raveena Vinayagan
- Penang – Olga Hutagoal
- Perak – Priscillia Peter
- Perlis – Samira Siadatan
- Putrajaya – Cass Chen
- Sabah – Sanjeda John
- Sarawak – Fiollaa Redup
- Selangor – Haaraneei Muthu Kumar
- Terengganu – Bibiana Green
