= Kota Kinabalu City Mosque =

Mosque in Kota Kinabalu, Sabah, Malaysia

- Masjid Bandaraya Kota Kinabalu
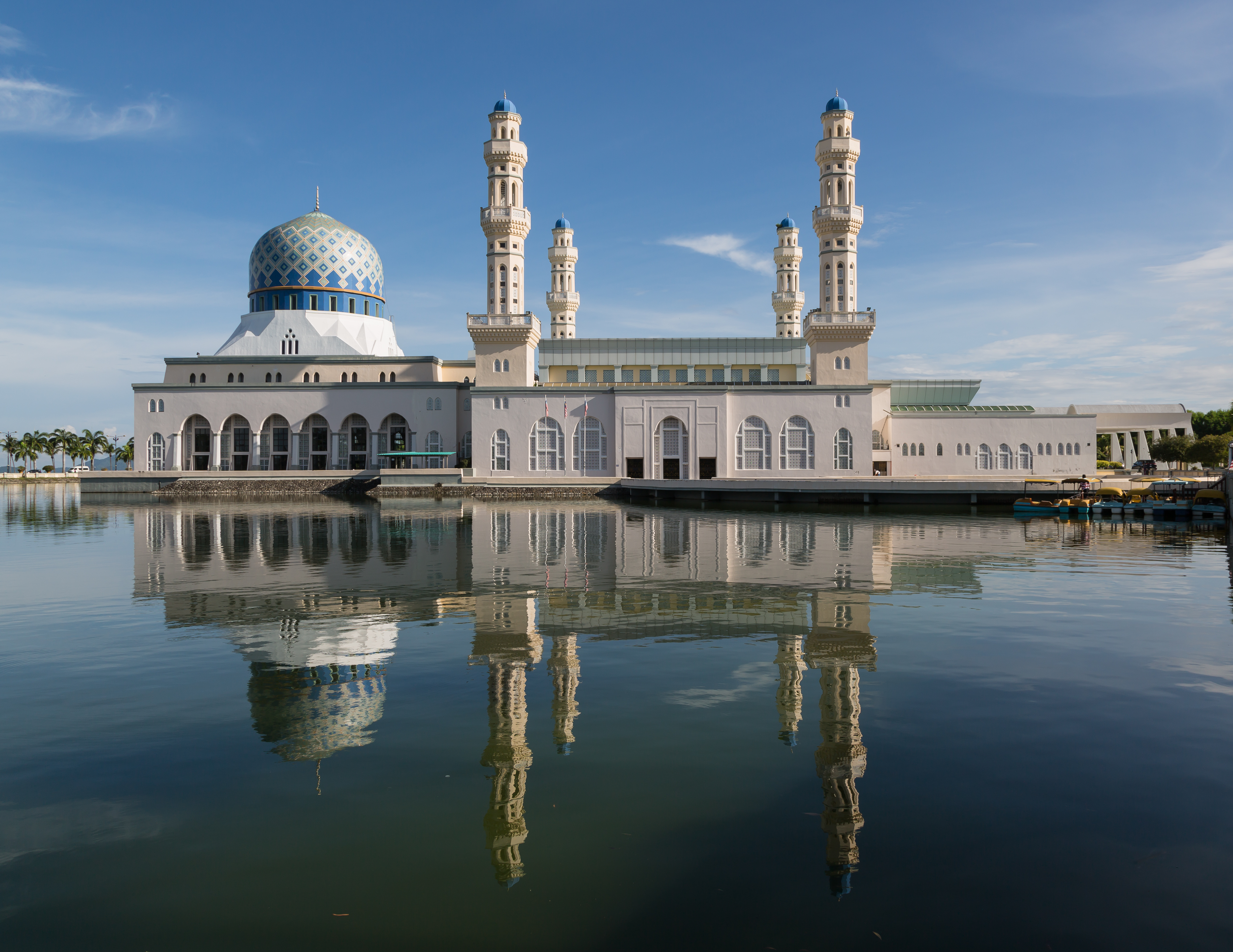

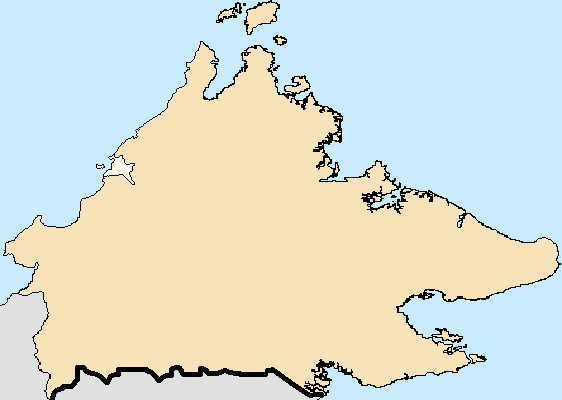
- Location within Kota Kinabalu

Religion
- Affiliation: Islam
- Branch/tradition: Sunni

Location
- Location: Kota Kinabalu, Sabah, Malaysia
- Coordinates: 5°59′45.0888″N 116°06′27.9″E

Architecture
- Construction cost: MYR34 million

Specifications
- Capacity: 12,000 worshippers
- Minaret: 4

Website
- mbr.sabah.org.my

The Kota Kinabalu City Mosque (Malay: Masjid Bandaraya Kota Kinabalu) is the second main mosque for the city of Kota Kinabalu in Likas, Kota Kinabalu, Sabah, Malaysia, after the State Mosque in Sembulan. The head imam is Hafiz Bin Hamzah.

== History ==
Construcion for the mosque began in 1989, and the installation of foundation piles began in 1992. Construction was delayed between 1993 and 1994 owing to a lack of funds. The mosque was officially opened on 2 February 2000 following a proclamation of the city status of Kota Kinabalu. Construction of the mosque cost 34 million Malaysian ringgits. The architectural design is based on the Nabawi Mosque, the second holiest site in Islam, in Medina, Saudi Arabia. The dome is blue and gold, inspired by similar Arabic architecture.

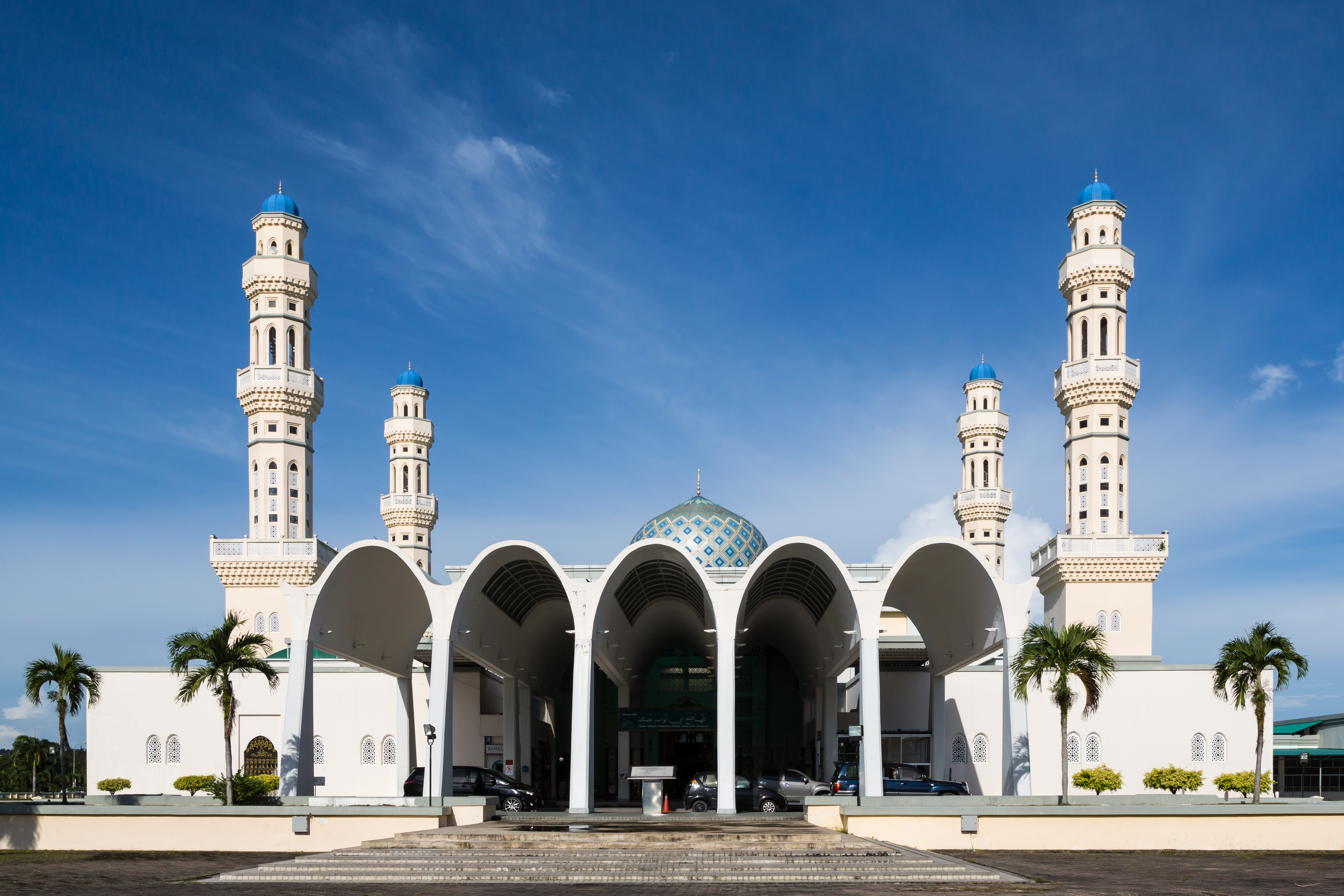
Front view of the mosque

== Features ==
The mosque sits on a 14.83-acre (6.00 ha) site at Pasir Road on the shores of Likas Bay, on the South China Sea. It is partially surrounded by a human-made lagoon; this has given rise to the nickname "The Floating Mosque". It has a maximum capacity of 12,000 worshipers. The mosque features an ATM, three madrasas, a palliative care clinic, and – in a joint project with Universiti Malaysia Sabah – a fish farm. In 2008, the mosque introduced paddle boat rides, from which visitors could see the mosque from the water; a mosque committee member stated that this was to "mak[e] the mosque more relevant to the community's life encompassing religion, economy and social aspects".

The mosque is a common tourist destination and included in several tours; it is also a common destination for photographers. The mosque may be visited by non-Muslims, except during prayers. Visitors are required to wear modest clothing; Lonely Planet recommends long trousers and covered arms.

== See also ==
- Islam in Malaysia
