= Miss Grand Malaysia 2018 =

3rd Miss Grand Malaysia pageant

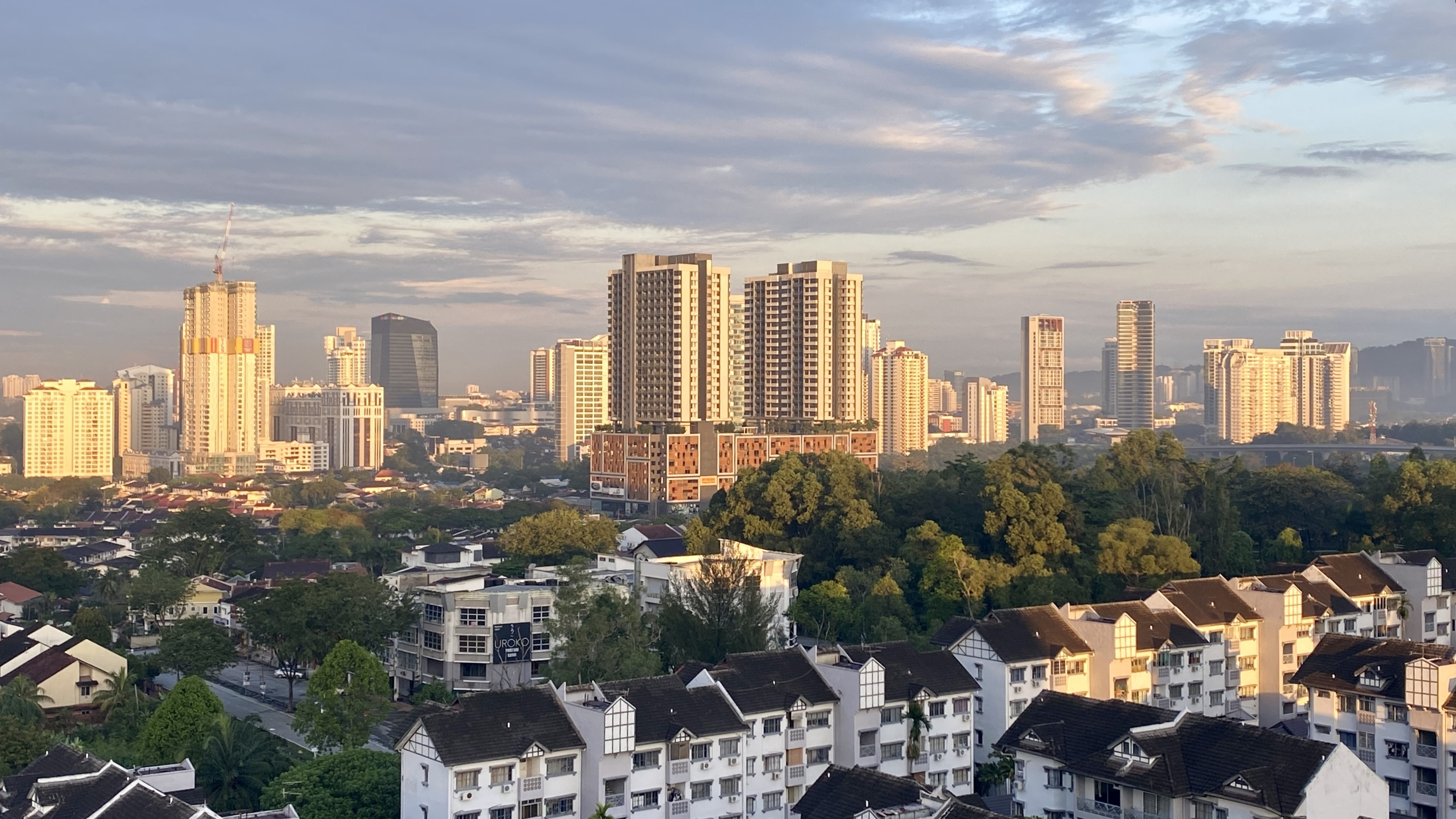
- Petaling Jaya, the host city of the contest
- Date: May 12, 2018
- Presenters: Nigel Chin; Brynn Lovett
- Venue: Grand Pacific Ballroom, Evolve Concept Mall, Petaling Jaya, Selangor
- Broadcaster: YouTube
- Entrants: 24
- Placements: 12
- Winner: Debra Jeanne Poh (Sabah)

Miss Grand Malaysia 2018 was the third edition of the Miss Grand Malaysia pageant, held on May 12, 2018, in the Grand Pacific Ballroom, Evolve Concept Mall, Petaling Jaya, Selangor. Twenty-four candidates, who qualified for the national stage through the state pageant or national audition, competed for the title.

At the end of the event, a 22-year-old logistic assistant from Labuan, Debra Jeanne Poh, was announced the winner. Debra later represented Malaysia in the international parent stage, Miss Grand International 2018, held in October of that year in Myanmar, but she was unplaced. Meanwhile, the pageant's first and second runners-up, Kate Cantwell and Scarlett Megan Liew, were assigned to compete internationally at Miss Intercontinental 2018 and Miss Globe 2018, respectively.

== Selection of contestants ==
=== Overview ===
The national finalists for the Miss Grand Malaysia 2018 pageant were determined through three selection systems: the 8 automatic spots were given to the respective state pageant winners and first-runner-up (Kuala Lumpur, Malacca, Sabah, and Sarawak) while the remaining 16 were pre-determined from either the state pageant finalists or the central audition. The wildcard format is based on decisions made by the Miss Grand Malaysia director, Jude Benjamin, who would pick potential contestants considered to be ones with great potential and deserving of the chance to compete on the national stage.

=== Regional pageants ===
Out of sixteen states and federal territories of Malaysia, only four held the regional preliminary pageants for Miss Grand Malaysia 2018, including, Kuala Lumpur, Malacca, Sabah, and Sarawak. In addition to the state winners, some state runners-up or finalists also qualified for the national stage.

In the Borneo States, division-level pageants were also held, 12 pageants in all 12 divisions of Sarawak and 7 pageants in Sabah, to determine the local representatives for the state-level contest.

The details of Miss Grand Malaysia 2018's state-level pageants are detailed below.

List of the state preliminary contest of Miss Grand Malaysia 2018
State pageant	Final date and venue	Entrants	National qualifier(s)			Ref.
State pageant	Final date and venue	Entrants	Winner	Runner-up	Wild card	Ref.
Miss Grand Sabah	March 24, 2018, at the Auditorium Complex JKKN Sabah, Kota Kinabalu	35	1	1	3	
Miss Grand Sarawak	March 31, 2018, at the RH Hotel, Sibu	24	1	1	3	
Miss Grand Kuala Lumpur	April 6, 2018, at the Palace Of The Golden Horses Hotel, Seri Kembangan	16	1	2	3	
Miss Grand Malacca	April 7, 2018, at the Settlement Hotel, Malacca City	11	1	1	2	

== Result ==
Position	Delegate
Miss Grand Malaysia 2018	Sabah – Debra Jeanne Poh
1st runner-up	Sabah – Kate Cantwell
2nd runner-up	Sabah – Scarlett Megan Liew
3rd runner-up	Kuala Lumpur – Taanusiya Veerapandian
4th runner-up	Sarawak – Rachel Chin
Top 7	Kuala Lumpur – Jaspreet Kaur; Kuala Lumpur – Lekha Nadarajan
Top 12	Kuala Lumpur – Kai Chin; Kuala Lumpur – Rheanna Deandra; Kuala Lumpur – Nanthini Nadarajah; Sarawak – Caithlin Supang; Sarawak – Ellna Jiway
Special awards
Best in Swimwear	Sabah – Scarlett Megan Liew
Best in Evening Gown	Sarawak – Rachel Chin
Best Advocacy	Sabah – Debra Jeanne Poh; Sabah – Kate Cantwell; Sarawak – Caithlin Supang
Miss Public Vote	Sabah – Scarlett Megan Liew
Miss Popularity	Kuala Lumpur – Jaspreet Kaur

== Contestants ==
Twenty-four contestants from six states and federal territory competed for the title.

Team Kuala Lumpur (9)		Team Malacca (4)		Team Penang (1)
State winner	Taanusiya Veerapandian	State winner	Valentina Monteiro	Central wild card	Shanggaree Baskaran
State runners-up	Audrey Wong; Erma Masilla Kotiu	State runner-up	Cherlyn Ong
State runners-up	Audrey Wong; Erma Masilla Kotiu	State wild card	Arthi Ganesen; Claire Easter Rigis
State wild card	Nanthini Nadarajah; Sivasakti Alexander; Kai Chin	State wild card	Arthi Ganesen; Claire Easter Rigis
State wild card	Nanthini Nadarajah; Sivasakti Alexander; Kai Chin	blank	blank
Central wild card	Jaspreet Kaur; Lekha Nadarajan; Rheanna Deandra
Team Sabah (4)		Team Sarawak (5)		Team Selangor (1)
State winner	Scarlett Megan Liew	State winner	Theresa Lieyshar Seri	Central wild card	Nisha Suwandy
State runner-up	Kate Cantwell	State runner-up	Rachel Chin Jia Ning
State wild card	Debra Jeanne Poh; Cynthia Avat Aing; Saneeha Sajoo (withdrew)	State wild card	Caithlin Supang; Ellna Jiway; Maydinia Mino
