= Miss Grand Malaysia 2019 =

4th Miss Grand Malaysia pageant

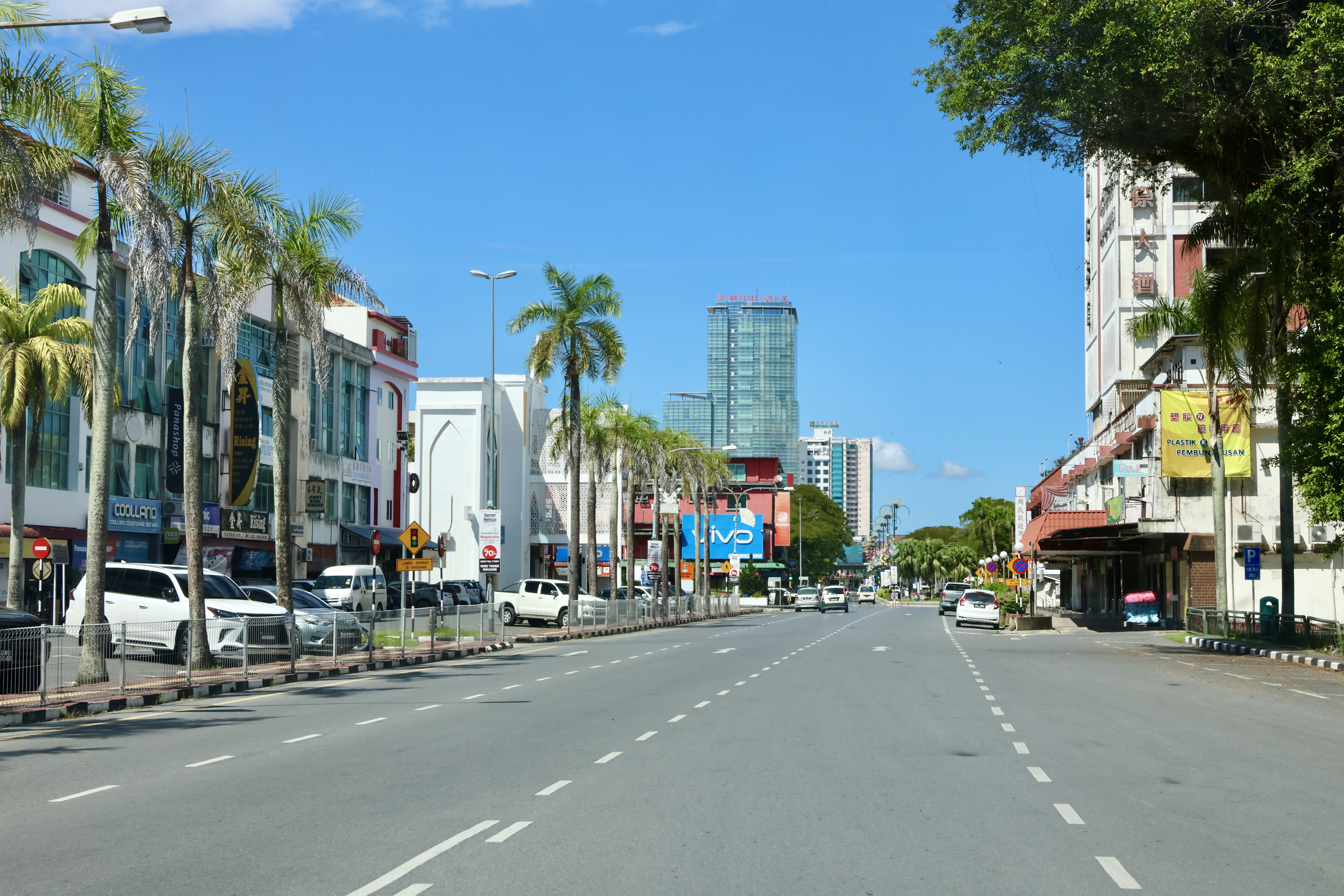
- Miri, the host city of the contest
- Date: April 28, 2019
- Presenters: Dan Ling; Shannen Totten
- Entertainment: Pete Kallang; Clinton Chua
- Venue: Meritz Hotel, Miri, Sarawak
- Broadcaster: YouTube
- Entrants: 23
- Placements: 12
- Winner: Mel Dequanne Abar (Sabah)

Miss Grand Malaysia 2019 was the fourth edition of the Miss Grand Malaysia pageant, held on April 28, 2019, at the Meritz Hotel, Miri, Sarawak. Twenty-three candidates, who qualified for the national stage through the state pageant or national audition, competed for the title.

At the end of the event, a 20-year-old Sino-Kadazan from Kota Kinabalu, Mel Dequanne Abar, was announced as the winner. Mel later represented Malaysia in the international parent stage, Miss Grand International 2019, held in October of that year in Venezuela, but she was unplaced. Meanwhile, Saroopdeep Kaur Bath of Perak and Haaraneei Muthu Kumar of Selangor were named the first and second runners-up, respectively. Both were sent to compete internationally as well.

The event was supported by the Sarawak Tourism Board and Miri City Council, and featured a live performance of local singers Pete Kallang and Clinton Chua. In addition, the host city for the following Miss Grand Malaysia edition, Kota Kinabalu of Sabah, was also announced.

Miss Grand International's vice president, Teresa Chaivisut, and Miss Grand International 2018, Clara Sosa of Paraguay, were also present at the event.

== Selection of contestants ==
=== Overview ===
The national finalists for the Miss Grand Malaysia 2019 pageant were determined through three selection systems: the 10 automatic spots were given to the respective state pageant winners and first-runner-up (Kuala Lumpur, Malacca, Sabah, Sarawak, and Selangor), while the remaining 14 were pre-determined from either the state pageant finalists or the central audition. The wildcard format is based on decisions made by the Miss Grand Malaysia director, Jude Benjamin, who would pick potential contestants considered to be ones with great potential and deserving of the chance to compete on the national stage.

=== Regional pageants ===
Out of sixteen states and federal territories of Malaysia, only five held the regional preliminary pageants for Miss Grand Malaysia 2017, including, Kuala Lumpur, Malacca, Sabah, and Sarawak. In addition to the state winners, some state runners-up or finalists also qualified for the national stage.

In the Borneo States (Sabah and Sarawak), division-level pageants were also held to determine the local representatives for the state-level contest.

The Miss Grand Malaysia 2018's state-level pageants are detailed below.

List of the state preliminary contest of Miss Grand Malaysia 2019
State pageant	Final date and venue	Entrants	National qualifier(s)			Ref.
State pageant	Final date and venue	Entrants	Winner	Runner-up	Wild card	Ref.
Miss Grand Selangor	February 24, 2019, at the Empire Hotel, Subang Jaya	14	1	1	1	
Miss Grand Kuala Lumpur	March 9, 2019, at the Evolve Concept Mall, Petaling Jaya	16	1	1	0	
Miss Grand Sabah	March 9, 2018, at the Palm Square Center Point, Kota Kinabalu	36	1	1	3	
Miss Grand Malacca	March 16, 2019, at the Seri Chendana Ballroom & Cafe, Ayer Keroh	11	1	1	0	
Miss Grand Sarawak	March 30, 2019, at the Kingwood Hotel, Sibu	15	1	1	2	

== Result ==
Position	Delegate
Miss Grand Malaysia 2019	Sabah – Mel Dequanne Abar
1st runner-up	Perak – Saroopdeep Kaur Bath
2nd runner-up	Selangor – Haaraneei Muthu Kumar
Top 5	Selangor – Lishalliny Kanara; Sarawak – Julie Minele Senele
Top 12	Johor – Gloria Jane Fernandez; Kuala Lumpur – Kishweni Jaganathan; Sarawak – Emily Chieng Dee Ling; Sarawak – Emily Elizabeth Beard; Sarawak – Lysandra Gabriel Storie; Sabah – Valerie Sim; Selangor – Simona Boonratana
Special awards
Miss Beautiful Skin	Sarawak – Emily Elizabeth Beard
Miss Popular Vote	Sarawak – Emily Chieng Dee Ling
Miss Congeniality	Kuala Lumpur – Simona Boonratana
Miss Top Model	Sabah – Mel Dequanne Abar
Miss Elegance	Sarawak – Julie Minele Senele
Miss Viral	Sabah – Malle Christian Anderson Barlus
Best in Evening Gown	Selangor – Haaraneei Muthu Kumar

== Contestants ==
Initially, Twenty-four contestants from eight states and federal territory confirmed to participate, but one withdrew, making the final of 23 contestants.

Team Kuala Lumpur (2)		Team Malacca (2)		Team Selangor (4)
State winner	Kishweni Jaganathan	State winner	Devhia Barathi	State winner	Haaraneei Muthu Kumar
State runner-up	Chermaine Kang Yi Ting	State runner-up	Lydia Yeo Sze Ern	State runner-up	Simona Boonratana
				State wild card	Lishalliny Kanaran
				Central wild card	Rubini Kandhsamy (withdrew)
Team Sabah (5)		Team Sarawak (8)		Team Johor (1)
State winner	Mel Dequanne Abar	State winner	Julie Minele Senele	Central wild card	Gloria Jane Fernandez
State runner-up	Valerie Sim	State runner-up	Lysandra Gabriel Storie
State wild card	Malle Christian Anderson; Michelle Voo; Velma Victorianus	State wild card	Adriana Liun David; Gloria Kelbin	Team Pahang (1)
State wild card	Malle Christian Anderson; Michelle Voo; Velma Victorianus	State wild card	Adriana Liun David; Gloria Kelbin	Central wild card	Anna Jhia-Jhia Tan
State wild card	Malle Christian Anderson; Michelle Voo; Velma Victorianus	Central wild card	Emily Elizabeth Beard; Emily Chieng Dee Ling; Marilyn Lenggie; Zoey Marie Anderson
		Central wild card	Emily Elizabeth Beard; Emily Chieng Dee Ling; Marilyn Lenggie; Zoey Marie Anderson	Team Perak (1)
		Central wild card	Emily Elizabeth Beard; Emily Chieng Dee Ling; Marilyn Lenggie; Zoey Marie Anderson	Central wild card	Saroopdeep Kaur Bath
