= Sabah Hakka Complex =

Building in Kota Kinabalu, Sabah, Malaysia

- 沙巴客家情结; Kompleks Hakka Sabah
- Interactive map of the Sabah Hakka Complex area

General information
- Type: Clan assembly hall, conference and exhibition centre
- Architectural style: Tulou
- Location: Lot No. 26, Signal Hill Road, Tanjung Lipat, 88400 Likas, Kota Kinabalu, Sabah, Malaysia
- Coordinates: 5°59′41.1″N 116°05′18.1″E
- Construction started: 2013
- Completed: May 2014
- Opened: 27 March 2015
- Inaugurated: 28 March 2015
- Cost: RM10 million
- Owner: United Sabah and Labuan Hakka Association

Other information
- Parking: Yes

Sabah Hakka Complex (Chinese: 沙巴客家情结; Malay: Kompleks Hakka Sabah) is a five-storey building complex with a multi-purpose event hall and an in-house fine dining seafood restaurant located in Lot No. 26, Signal Hill Road, Tanjung Lipat, Likas, Kota Kinabalu, Sabah, Malaysia. The building was a gift of the Sabah government to the dominant minority local Hakka Chinese community's contributions to the economy of Sabah since their early migration period with the main building structure is designed after the world-famous traditional Hakka houses in Fujian of China, the Tulao.

== Features ==
The complex features two main buildings of Wisma Hakka and Dewan Hakka (Hakka Hall). The hall became the centre for the inaugural Hakka International Creativity Forum 2015. In 2019, the Manchester United Malaysia fan club's fourth annual dinner was held in the hall with the invitation of the club's legendary veteran retired footballer, Ronny Johnsen.
