= Miss Grand Malaysia 2025 =

10th Miss Grand Malaysia competition

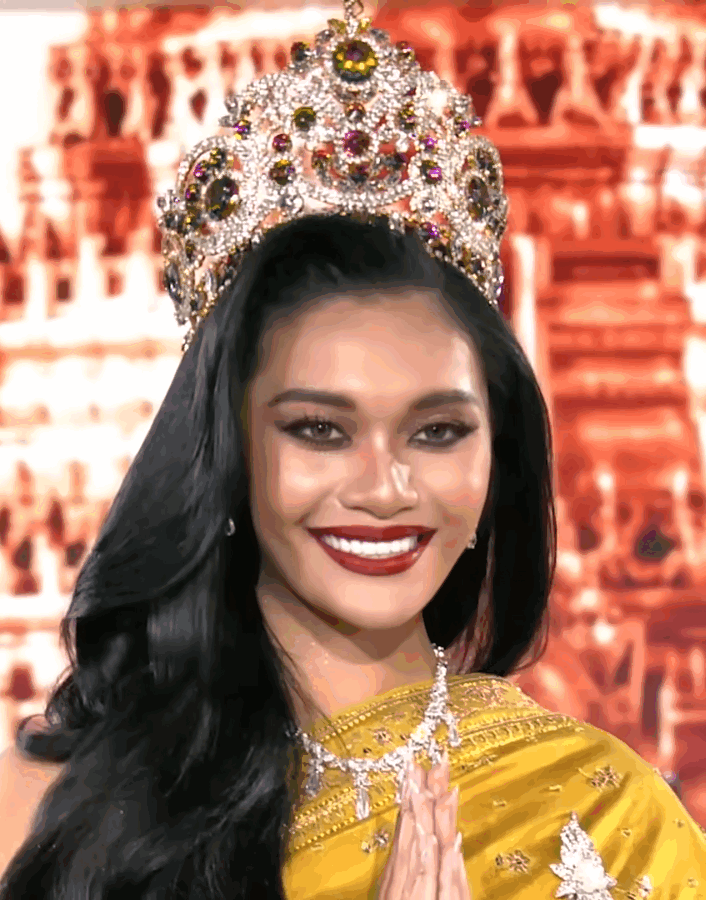
- Viviana Lin Winston
- Date: 30 July 2025
- Venue: Galaxy Banquet Hall, HGH Convention Centre, Kuala Lumpur
- Broadcaster: YouTube
- Entrants: 8
- Placements: 5
- Winner: Viviana Lin Winston (Sarawak)
- Photogenic: Fumiko Kriss (Sarawak)

External videos
- Grand final competition

Miss Grand Malaysia 2025 was the 10th edition of the Miss Grand Malaysia pageant, held on 30 July 2025, at the Galaxy Banquet Hall, HGH Convention Centre, Kuala Lumpur. Eight contestants competed for the title.

The contest, which consisted of the traditional attire, sportswear, evening gown, and question-and-answer rounds, was won by Viviana Lin Winston of Sarawak, thereby qualifying her to represent Malaysia internationally at the Miss Grand International 2025 pageant, that took place on 18 October 2025 in Bangkok, Thailand.

The event was also attended by Miss Grand International 2024 CJ Opiaza of the Philippines and the vice president of Miss Grand International Teresa Chaivisut.

== Result ==
Miss Grand Malaysia 2025 competition results by States and federal territories
Color key:
Winner	1st Runner-up
2nd Runner-up	3rd Runner-up
4th Runner-up	Unplaced
Did not compete

Position	Delegate
Miss Grand Malaysia 2025	Sarawak – Viviana Lin Winston
1st runner-up	Negeri Sembilan – Nisha Thayananthan
2nd runner-up	Sabah – Rochil Apa Sagarino
3rd runner-up	Johor – Orange Ooi
4th runner-up	Sarawak II – Fumiko Kriss

Special awards
Award	Winner
Miss Personality	Johor – Orange Ooi
Miss Eloquence	Negeri Sembilan – Nisha Thayananthan
Best in Fitness	Johor – Orange Ooi
Miss Elegance	Sarawak – Viviana Lin Winston
Miss Top Model	Sabah – Rochil Apa Sagarino
Miss Body Beautiful	Selangor – Sandra Aneisha
Miss Photogenic	Sarawak II – Fumiko Kriss
Miss Talent	Johor – Orange Ooi
Best in Evening Gown	Sabah – Rochil Apa Sagarino
King King Ambassador	Sarawak – Viviana Lin Winston
Live-commerce Star	Negeri Sembilan – Nisha Thayananthan
Miss Popularity	Sarawak – Viviana Lin Winston
Miss Social Media	Sarawak – Viviana Lin Winston
People's Choice	Negeri Sembilan – Nisha Thayananthan

== Contestants ==
The following contestants have been confirmed; no state-level pageant was held to determine the state representative for this year's edition.

- Johor – Orange Ooi
- Kuala Lumpur – Vaisahi West
- Negeri Sembilan – Nisha Thayananthan
- Penang – Lyyane Nugget
- Sabah – Rochil Apa Sagarino
- Sarawak I – Viviana Lin Winston
- Sarawak II – Fumiko Kriss
- Selangor – Sandra Aneisha
