= Likas =

- Township and sub-district
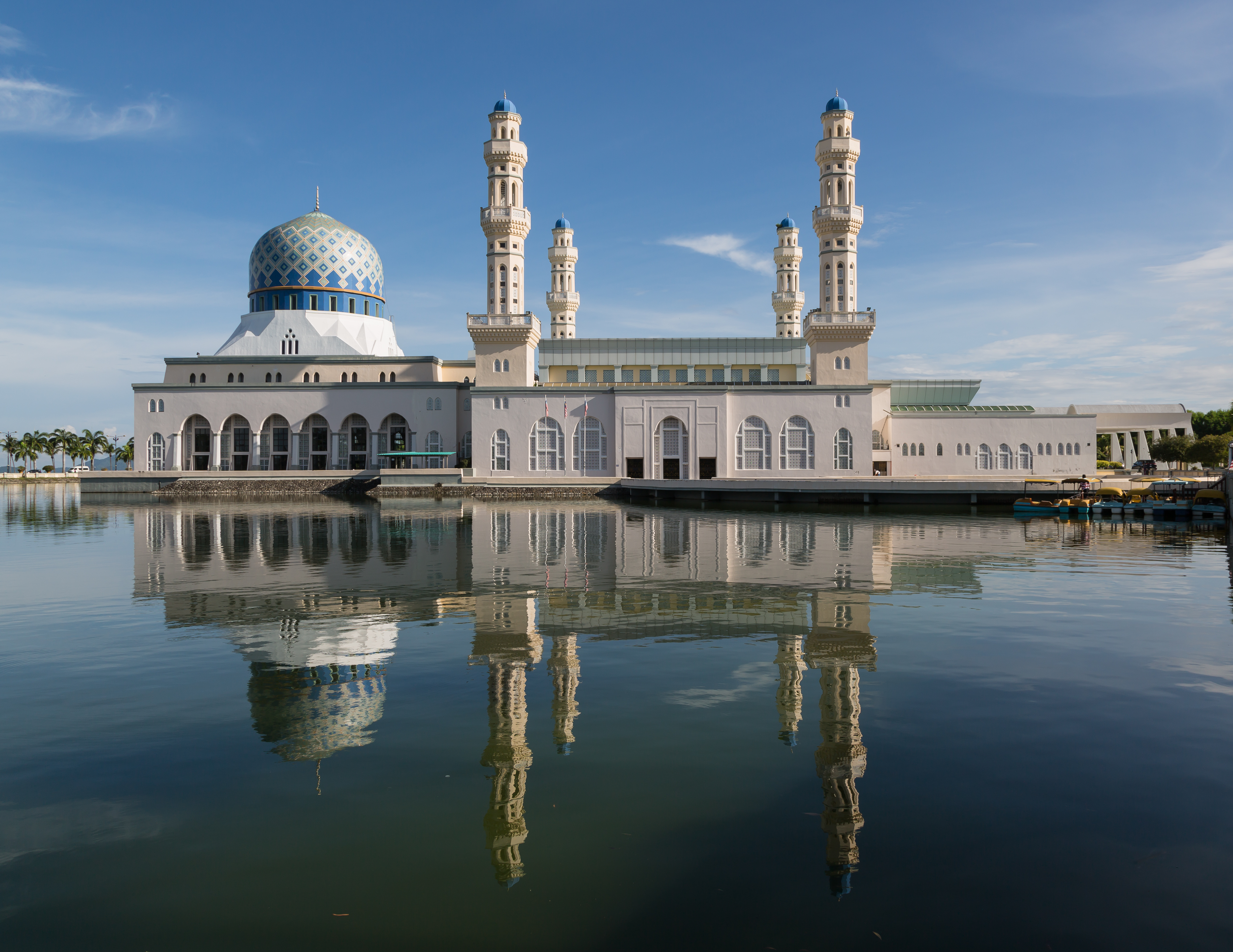
- The Kota Kinabalu City Mosque is located in Likas
- Country: Malaysia
- State: Sabah
- Division: West Coast
- District: Kota Kinabalu

Government
  - Body: Kota Kinabalu City Hall
- Neighbourhood Area: Inanam, Kota Kinabalu, Kelombong, Kingfisher Plaza

Likas is a sub-district in the city of Kota Kinabalu, Malaysia and is the location of several buildings or landmarks such as the Sabah International Convention Centre, the Signal Hill Observatory Tower, Kota Kinabalu City Mosque, Kinabalu Tower, Sabah Trade Centre, Tun Mustapha Tower, Wisma Innoprise, Sabah Hakka Complex as well as the Sabah State Legislative Assembly. This area is also mostly covered by housing estates such as the Likas Village. Likas is also a bustling metropolitan area where new high skyscrapers buildings have recently flourished.

The area is also known for its beaches, the "Tanjung Lipat or Likas Bay", a coastal line stretching about 7 kilometres from the city port until the Tun Mustapha Tower. Along the bay is the coastal road that connects much of the city parts together with a jogging and cycling trek as well with an open space eateries known locally as "Anjung Selera" that opens until late night. The international dragon boat race is held every year in the bay.
