= Miss Grand Malaysia 2020 =

5th Miss Grand Malaysia pageant

- Date: January 28, 2021
- Venue: Online pageant
- Broadcaster: YouTube
- Entrants: 18
- Placements: 7
- Winner: Jasebel Robert (Kuala Lumpur)

Miss Grand Malaysia 2020 was the fifth edition of the Miss Grand Malaysia pageant, held virtually due to the COVID-19 pandemic. Eighteen candidates who qualified for the national round experienced several interview processes and public votes to determine the final winner, of whom a 25-year-old, of mixed Indian and Chinese ancestry, from Kuala Lumpur, Jasebel Robert, has been named Miss Grand Malaysia 2020 in the final round on January 28, 2021.

Initially, the pageant was scheduled to happen physically in Kota Kinabalu, Sabah, but due to the outbreak, it was re-located to the Kuala Lumpur, and was then postponed twice until January 2021, when the organizer decided to organize the entire event virtually.

Jasebel Robert later represented Malaysia at the international parent stage, Miss Grand International 2020, held on March 27, 2021, in Bangkok, Thailand, where she won the Miss Popular Vote Award and was automatically placed among the top 10 finalists, which was also considered, as of 2024, the highest placement the Malaysian delegates ever obtained in the aforementioned international platform.

== Background ==
In the grand final of Miss Grand Malaysia 2019, in addition to crowning the winner, the host of the event also revealed that the national organizer, in cooperation with several local organs, had already set the Borneo's Kota Kinabalu as the host city of the succeeding edition, Miss Grand Malaysia 2020. However, due to the COVID-19 pandemic, the organizer decided to re-located the event to the capital, Kuala Lumpur, and the final coronation night was scheduled for late June 2020.

Since the outbreak was not eliminated, the organizer rescheduled the program to mid-October, 2020, with the press-conference held on September 4, 2020, at the Bangi Avenue Convention Center (BACC), Kajang. It was then re-program again to January 2021. Until an early January 2021, due to such a pandemic, the organizer decided to arrange the event virtually instead of the traditional pageant, eighteen contestants confirmed to participate.

== Selection of contestants ==
State preliminary contests of Miss Grand Malaysia 2020
| State | Final date and venue | Entrants | Qualifier(s) | | | Ref. |
| State | Final date and venue | Entrants | 1st place, gold medalist(s) | RU | WC | Ref. |
|---|---|---|---|---|---|---|
| Selangor | July 25, 2020, at the Malaysia Tourism Centre (MaTiC), Kuala Lumpur | 10 | 1 | 1 | 2 | |
| Kuala Lumpur | March 15, 2020, at the Swiss-Garden Hotel Bukit Bintang, Kuala Lumpur | 14 | 1 | 2 | 1 | |
The preliminary contests in Malacca, Sabah, Sarawak, and Johor, was canceled due to the COVID-19 pandemic.

=== Overview ===
Originally, the national finalists for the Miss Grand Malaysia 2020 pageant would consist of 24 contestants. who were determined through three selection systems: the 12 automatic spots for the respective state pageant winners and first-runner-up (Johor, Kuala Lumpur, Malacca, Sabah, Sarawak, and Selangor), and the remaining 12 were pre-determined from either the state pageant finalists or the central audition. The number of delegates was reduced to 18 due to the cancelation of several state pageants. Most of them were selected through the wild card system.

=== Regional pageants ===
Initially, six states and federal territory were expected to organize the state pageant for Miss Grand Malaysia 2020. However, due to the COVID-19 pandemic, four state pageants, including Malacca, Sabah, Sarawak, and Johor, were entirely canceled. Only the states of Selangor and Kuala Lumpur successfully organized the events, whose winners and runners-up automatically qualified for the national stage.

== Result ==
| Position | Delegate |
|---|---|
| Miss Grand Malaysia 2020 | Kuala Lumpur – Jasebel Robert |
| Top 7 | Johor – Malveen Kaur; Kuala Lumpur – Sarah Cynthia; Malacca – Pretty Tey Pei Ling; Sarawak – Kelly Raywyn Cahill; Selangor – Kimberly Soh Jing Hui; Selangor – Lishallinny Kanaran |

== Contestants ==
Eighteen contestants from five states and federal territory competed for the title.

| Team Kuala Lumpur (6) | | Team Selangor (6) | | Team Sarawak (2) |
| State winner | Melissa Aurellia | State winner | Lishallinny Kanaran | State wild card | Angela Kon; Kelly Raywyn Cahill |
| State runners-up | Poorani Rajoo; Vinthiya Vasu | State runner-up | Mellanie Yew Hoe Yan | State wild card | Angela Kon; Kelly Raywyn Cahill |
| State runners-up | Poorani Rajoo; Vinthiya Vasu | State wild card | Meagala Kanesh; Reeta Kaur |
| State wild card | Lindsey Yap Li See | State wild card | Meagala Kanesh; Reeta Kaur |
| Central wild card | Jasebel Robert; Sarah Cynthia | Central wild card | Giselle Tay; Kimberly Soh Jing Hui |
| Team Johor (3) | | Team Malacca (1) |
| State wild card | Venus Xabelle Iyn | State wild card | Pretty Tey Pei Ling |
| Central wild card | Esther Tan Yu Xing; Malveen Kaur |
