= Sabah International Convention Centre =

Malaysian convention center

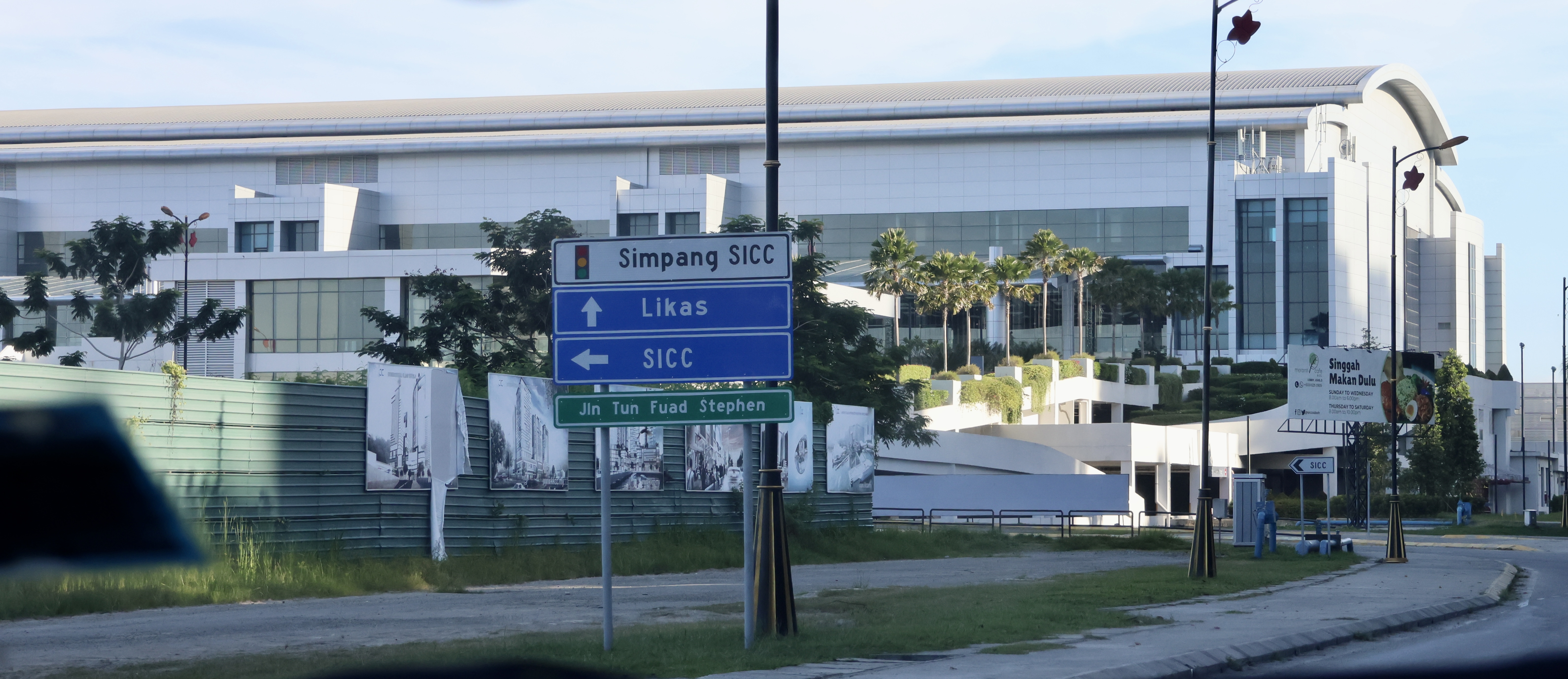
- SICC building along with road sign.
- Interactive map of Sabah International Convention Centre
- Address: Tun Fuad Stephens Road, Tanjung Lipat, 88400 Likas
- Location: Kota Kinabalu, Sabah, Malaysia
- Coordinates: 5°59′44.32″N 116°5′2.25″E
- Owner: Innoprise Corporation Sdn Bhd (Subsidiary of Yayasan Sabah Group)

Construction
- Opened: 2020

Website
- siccsabah.com

The Sabah International Convention Centre (SICC) (Malay: Pusat Konvensyen Antarabangsa Sabah) is the largest waterfront purpose-built facility in East Malaysia and also the largest convention centre in Borneo island. The complex's gross built-up is 60,504 m^{2} (651,260 sq ft) on a 6 hectares (15 acres) site.

SICC is the main convention and exhibition facility serving Kota Kinabalu City, whilst the other several ones are Sabah Hakka Complex, Putera Ballroom, Sabah Trade Centre and Sutera Harbour convention facilities.

== Description ==
The 6-hectare (15-acre) multi-functional complex spreads over five levels, a convention hall with a retractable partition system dividing into three sections, each multi-purpose hall catering up to 2000 delegates; offering a combined floor space of 6,800 m^{2} (73,000 sq ft) including an extensive pre-function area. On a separate level, three contiguous exhibit halls encompassing a 5,177 m^{2} (55,720 sq ft) flexible event space, six meeting rooms and private lounges. The top floor is dedicated to 12 individual private meeting rooms, a performance arts hall with seating capacity of 1,250 in a two-tier amphitheater accompanied by VIP rooms and lounges. Connecting to the main lobby, an outdoor plaza of 7,000 m^{2} (75,000 sq ft) is usable for open concerts and exhibitions.

== Facilities ==
The convention centre has the following facilities:

=== SICC Café ===
This cafe is located on Level 3, in the main lobby.

=== Convention hall (Sipadan I, II & III) ===
The conference and convention halls are located on Level 4 and total 5,200 square metres (56,000 sq ft) with 11 m (36 ft) high ceiling and seat up to 4,000 delegates in theatre style seating. The convention hall has removable partitions which splits the room into three; offering a classroom style capacity of 792 in each hall. This includes a pre-function hall outside with a capacity of up to 68 booths.

=== Exhibition hall (Kinabatangan I, II & III) ===
The exhibition halls are located on Level 2. The multi-purpose hall is used for exhibitions, banquets, sports and other entertainment events. Across from the pre-function area are six separate meeting room of various sizes with addition to a private VVIP lounge.
