= Teresa Chaivisut =

Thai businessperson

Teresa Yuphayao Chaivisut
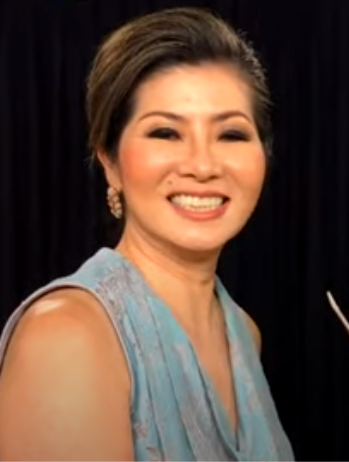
- Teresa Chaivisut in 2021
- Born: Yuphayao Chaivisut; 30 July 1977 (age 49); Bangkok, Thailand
- Citizenship: Thailand
- Education: Saint Joseph Convent; Amstrong State University
- Occupation: Businessperson
- Years active: 2013–present
- Known for: Miss Grand International

Teresa Yuphayao Chaivisut (Thai: เทเรซ่า ยุพเยาว์ ชัยวิสุทธิ์) is a Thai businessperson who has been serving as the vice president of the Miss Grand International pageant since 2013. Chaivisut plays major roles in the organization's international affairs, such as international franchise management, as well as the responsibility of supervising the day-to-day business affairs of the Miss Grand International titleholders.

In addition to Miss Grand International, Chaivisut is also involved in the hotel and travel industries. She is currently the managing director of a Düsseldorf-based travel agency, REPS Unlimited.

== Early life ==
Chaivisut finished her secondary education at a private-owned Catholic girls' school, Saint Joseph Convent, and the higher education of a master degree in business administration from the Armstrong State University (currently, Georgia Southern University–Armstrong Campus), majoring in financial services.
