= Miss Grand Kamphaeng Phet =

Provincial pageant in Kamphaeng Phet, Thailand

Miss Grand Kamphaeng Phet มิสแกรนด์กำแพงเพชร
- Formation: April 17, 2016; 10 years ago
- Founder: Krit Pondetwisai
- Type: Beauty pageant
- Headquarters: Kamphaeng Phet
- Location: Thailand
- Official language: Thai
- Director: Yove Venus (2025)
- Affiliations: Miss Grand Thailand

Summary result of Kamphaeng Phet representatives at Miss Grand Thailand
| Placement | Number(s) |
|---|---|
| Winner | 0 |
| 1st runner-up | 1 |
| 2nd runner-up | 0 |
| 3rd runner-up | 0 |
| 4th runner-up | 0 |
| Top 10/11/12 | 1 |
| Top 20/21 | 1 |
| Unplaced | 6 |

Miss Grand Kamphaeng Phet (Thai: มิสแกรนด์กำแพงเพชร) is a Thai provincial beauty pageant which selects a representative from Kamphaeng Phet province to the Miss Grand Thailand national competition. It was founded in 2016 by a lance corporal, Krit Pondetwisai (กริช พลเดชวิสัย), as an inter-provincial pageant with other four provincial stages in the lower northern region.

Kamphaeng Phet representatives have yet to win the Miss Grand Thailand title. The highest placement they obtained was the first runner-up, won by Chatnarin Chotijirawarachat in 2017.

== History ==
In 2016, after Miss Grand Thailand began franchising the provincial competitions to individual organizers, who would name seventy-seven provincial titleholders to compete in the national pageant. The license for Kamphaeng Phet province was granted to a local policeman, Krit Pondetwisai, who was also the licensee for other 4 lower northern stages, including Phichit, Phitsanulok, Phetchabun, and Uttaradit. Pondetwisai co-organized the first Miss Grand Phichit with the mentioned 4 provincial stages in Mueang Phitsanulok on April 17, 2016, and named Manassanan Dailap the Kamphaeng Phet's winner. The license was then transferred to another organizer team led by Wilawan Tangtuadee (วิลาวรรณ ตั้งตัวดี) the following year.

The pageant was skipped once; in 2021, due to the COVID-19 pandemic in Thailand, the national organizer was unable to organize the national event, and the country representative for the international tournament was appointed instead.

Winner gallery

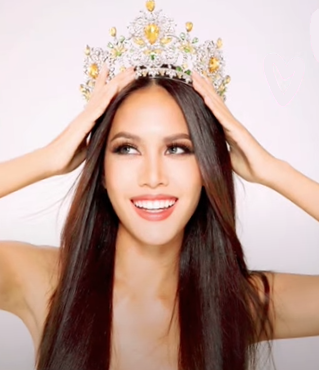
Kitiyaporn Intai,
Miss Grand Kamphaeng Phet 2021/22

== Editions ==
The following table details Miss Grand Kamphaeng Phet's annual editions since 2016.

| Edition | Date | Final venue | Entrants | Winner | Ref. |
|---|---|---|---|---|---|
| 1st (Note: As an inter-provincial pageant for Miss Grand Phitsanulok–Uttaradit–Phetchabun–Phichit–Kamphaeng Phet.) | April 17, 2016 | Phitsanulok Orchid Hotel, Mueang Phitsanulok, Phitsanulok | 15 | Manassanan Dailap | |
| 2nd | February 26, 2017 | Dipangkorn Rasmijoti Auditorium, Kamphaeng Phet Rajabhat University, Mueang Kamphaeng Phet, Kamphaeng Phet | 18 | Chatnarin Chotijirawarachat | |
| 3rd | April 8, 2018 | Dipangkorn Rasmijoti Auditorium, Kamphaeng Phet Rajabhat University, Mueang Kamphaeng Phet, Kamphaeng Phet | 11 | Piyaporn Chopudsa | |
| 4th | February 11, 2019 | Robinson Lifestyle Kamphaengphet, Mueang Kamphaeng Phet, Kamphaeng Phet | 20 | Mintra Sappathasevi | |
| 5th | August 15, 2020 | Chakungrao Riverview Hotel, Mueang Kamphaeng Phet, Kamphaeng Phet | 15 | Pannipa Phrombanrai | |
| 6th | February 15, 2022 | Kamphaeng Phet District Office's Front Field, Mueang, Kamphaeng Phet | 11 | Kittiyaporn Intai | |
| 7th | February 8, 2023 | Rattana-apha Auditorium, Kamphaeng Phet Rajabhat University, Mueang | 15 | Piyatida Sengluang | |
| 8th | November 23, 2023 | Thai Sirichit Park Cultural Conservation Grounds, Mueang, Kamphaeng Phet | 24 | Thitirat Saengdaeng | |
| 9th | October 30, 2024 | Laike Hotel, Chom Thong, Bangkok | 12 | Supisara Wattanakitpaisan | |
| 10th (Note: As an inter-provincial pageant for Miss Grand Ratchaburi, Miss Grand Nan,, Miss Grand Ang Thong, Miss Grand Kamphaeng Phet, Miss Grand Kalasin, and Miss Grand Nong Khai.) | October 26, 2025 | Rattana Bundit-Universität, Bangkok | 16 | Pimpakarn Musiko | |

== National competition ==
The following is a list of Kamphaeng Phet representatives who competed at the Miss Grand Thailand pageant.

| Year | Representative | | Original provincial title | Placement at Miss Grand Thailand | Provincial director | Ref. |
| Year | Romanized name | Thai name | Original provincial title | Placement at Miss Grand Thailand | Provincial director | Ref. |
|---|---|---|---|---|---|---|
| 2016 | Manassanan Dailap | มนัสนันท์ ได้ลาภ | Miss Grand Kamphaeng Phet 2016 | Unplaced | Krit Pondetwisai | |
| 2017 | Chatnarin Chotijirawarachat | ฉัตร์ณลิณ โชติจิรวราฉัตร | Miss Grand Kamphaeng Phet 2017 | 1st runner-up (Dethroned) | Wilawan Tangtuadee | |
| 2018 | Piyaporn Chopudsa | ปิยพร โชพุดซา | Miss Grand Kamphaeng Phet 2018 | Top 12 | Wilawan Tangtuadee | |
| 2019 | Mintra Sappathasevi | มินตรา ศัพทเสวี | Miss Grand Kamphaeng Phet 2019 | Top 20 | Wilawan Tangtuadee | |
| 2020 | Pannipa Phrombanrai | พรรณิภา พรหมบ้านไร่ | Miss Grand Kamphaeng Phet 2020 | Unplaced | Wilawan Tangtuadee | |
| 2021 | No national pageant due to the COVID-19 pandemic. | | | | | |
| 2022 | Kittiyaporn Intai | กิตติญาพร อินใต้ | Miss Grand Kamphaeng Phet 2021/22 | Unplaced | Wilawan Tangtuadee | |
| 2023 | Piyatida Sengluang | ปิยธิดา เส็งหลวง | Miss Grand Kamphaeng Phet 2023 | Unplaced | Wilawan Tangtuadee | |
| 2024 | Thitirat Saengdaeng | ฐิติรัตน์ แสงแดง | Miss Grand Kamphaeng Phet 2024 | Unplaced | Wilawan Tangtuadee | |
| 2025 | Supisara Wattanakitpaisan | ศุภิสรา วัฒนากิจไพศาล | Miss Grand Kamphaeng Phet 2025 | Unplaced | Yove Venus (alias) | |
| 2026 | Pimpakarn Musiko | พิมพกานต์ มุสิโก | Miss Grand Kamphaeng Phet 2026 | | Tain Kanyapak | |
