= Miss Grand Phetchabun =

Provincial pageant in Phetchabun, Thailand

Miss Grand ฺPhetchabun มิสแกรนด์เพชรบูรณ์
- Formation: April 17, 2016; 10 years ago
- Founder: Krit Pondetwisai
- Type: Beauty pageant
- Headquarters: Phetchabun
- Location: Thailand
- Official language: Thai
- Director: Phanuphon Sritong (2025)
- Affiliations: Miss Grand Thailand

Summary result of Phetchabun representatives at Miss Grand Thailand
Placement	Number(s)
Winner	0
1st runner-up	0
2nd runner-up	0
3rd runner-up	0
4th runner-up	0
Top 10/11/12	0
Top 20/21	1
Unplaced	7

Miss Grand Phetchabun (Thai: มิสแกรนด์เพชรบูรณ์) is a Thai provincial beauty pageant which selects a representative from Phetchabun province to the Miss Grand Thailand national competition. It was founded in 2016 by a lance corporal, Krit Pondetwisai (กริช พลเดชวิสัย), as an inter-provincial pageant with other four provincial stages in the lower northern region.

Phetchabun representatives have yet to win the Miss Grand Thailand title. The highest and only placement they obtained was in the top 20 finalists, achieved by Worawalan Phutklang in 2023.

== History ==
In 2016, after Miss Grand Thailand began franchising the provincial competitions to individual organizers, who would name seventy-seven provincial titleholders to compete in the national pageant. The license for Phetchabun province was granted to a local policeman, Krit Pondetwisai, who was also the licensee for other 4 lower northern stages, including Phitsanulok, Uttaradit, Phichit, and Kamphaeng Phet. Pondetwisai co-organized the first Miss Grand Phetchabun with the mentioned 4 provincial stages in Mueang Phitsanulok on April 17, 2016, and named an 18-year-old Paphitchaya Kritsawong the Phetchabun's winner. The license was then transferred to a Talent agent, Pitsada Songklod (ปิฏษฎา ทรงกลด), who served as the pageant director from 2017 to 2019.

The pageant was usually co-organized with other Miss Grand Thailand provincial stages; it was a stand-alone contest only in the 2017, 2018, 2023, and 2024 editions.

The pageant was skipped in 2022; due to the COVID-19 pandemic in Thailand, the national organizer was unable to organize the national event in 2021, the 2021 Miss Grand Phetchabun winner was sent to compete in the 2022 national stage instead.

Winner gallery

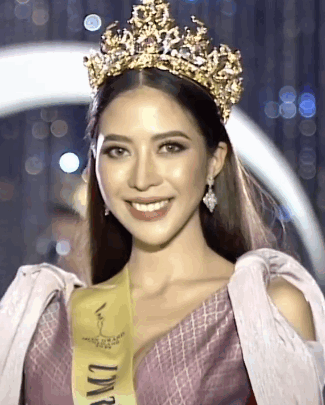
Suthida Ninpai,
Miss Grand Phetchabun 2021/22

== Editions ==
The following table details Miss Grand Phetchabun's annual editions since 2016.

Edition	Date	Final venue	Entrants	Winner	Ref.
1st (Note: As an inter-provincial pageant for Miss Grand Phitsanulok–Uttaradit–Phetchabun–Phichit–Kamphaeng Phet.)	April 17, 2016	Phitsanulok Orchid Hotel, Mueang Phitsanulok, Phitsanulok	15	Paphitchaya Kritsawong	
2nd	April 8, 2017	Phetchabun Metropolitan Cultural Hall, Mueang Phetchabun, Phetchabun	11	Siriwan Yotsutham	
3rd	March 17, 2018	Thai Lom Floating Market, Lom Sak, Phetchabun	10	Jarupitchaya Foithong	
4th (Note: As an inter-provincial pageant for Miss Grand Loei–Phetchabun–Nong Bua Lamphu.)	March 31, 2019	AU Place Hotel, Chiang Khan, Loei	13	Saowalak Uppakhot	
5th (Note: As an inter-provincial pageant for Miss Grand Phetchabun–Phichit.)	August 9, 2020	The Blue Sky Resort, Khao Kho, Phetchabun	12	Yupaluk Lakul	
6th (Note: As an inter-provincial pageant for Miss Grand Nakhon Sawan–Phetchabun–Phichit.)	April 3, 2021	Breeze Hill Resort, Khao Kho, Phetchabun	20	Suthida Ninpai	
7th	February 26, 2023	Club 747, Lat Krabang, Bangkok	13	Worawalan Phutklang	
8th	January 29, 2024	Ibis Styles Bangkok Ratchada, Huai Khwang, Bangkok	12	Nicharee Sukitprasert	
9th (Note: As an inter-provincial pageant for Miss Grand Ubon Ratchathani–Phetchabun.)	November 2, 2024	Sunee Grand Hotel and Convention Center, Mueang Ubon Ratchathani	15	Thipsuda Manmuang	

== National competition ==
The following is a list of Phetchabun representatives who competed at the Miss Grand Thailand pageant.

Year	Representative		Original provincial title	Placement at Miss Grand Thailand	Provincial director	Ref.
Year	Romanized name	Thai name	Original provincial title	Placement at Miss Grand Thailand	Provincial director	Ref.
2016	Paphitchaya Kritsawong	ปพิชญา กฤษวงศ์	Miss Grand Phetchabun 2016	Unplaced	Krit Pondetwisai	
2017	Siriwan Yotsutham	ศิริวรรณ ยศสุธรรม	Miss Grand Phetchabun 2017	Unplaced	Pitsada Songklod	
2018	Jarupitchaya Foithong	จารุพิชญา ฝอยทอง	Miss Grand Phetchabun 2018	Unplaced	Pitsada Songklod	
2019	Saowalak Uppakhot	เสาวลักษณ์ อุปโคตร	Miss Grand Phetchabun 2019	Unplaced	Pitsada Songklod	
2020	Yupaluk Lakul	ยุพาลักษณ์ ลากุล	Miss Grand Phetchabun 2020	Unplaced	Punnapat Sripakawadeepathumma	
2021	No national pageant due to the COVID-19 pandemic.					
2022	Suthida Ninpai	สุทธิดา นิลพาย	Miss Grand Phetchabun 2021/22	Unplaced	Unknown	
2023	Worawalan Phutklang	วรวลัญช์ พุฒกลาง	Miss Grand Phetchabun 2023	Top 20	Krittasakorn Jammpathong	
2024	Nicharee Sukitprasert	ณิชารีย์ สุกิจประเสริฐ	Miss Grand Phetchabun 2024	Unplaced	Krittasakorn Jammpathong	
2025	Thipsuda Manmuang	ทิพย์สุดา มั่นเมือง	Miss Grand Phetchabun 2025	Unplaced	Phanuphon Sritong	
