= Miss Grand Phitsanulok =

Provincial pageant in Phitsanulok, Thailand

Miss Grand Phitsanulok มิสแกรนด์พิษณุโลก
- Formation: April 17, 2016; 10 years ago
- Founder: Krit Pondetwisai
- Type: Beauty pageant
- Headquarters: Phitsanulok
- Location: Thailand
- Official language: Thai
- Director: Kanoknat Likitpraiwan (2017–2018, 2021–present)
- Affiliations: Miss Grand Thailand

Summary result of Phitsanulok representatives at Miss Grand Thailand
Placement	Number(s)
Winner	0
1st runner-up	0
2nd runner-up	0
3rd runner-up	0
4th runner-up	0
Top 10/11/12	0
Top 20/21	2
Unplaced	7

Miss Grand Phitsanulok (Thai: มิสแกรนด์พิษณุโลก) is a Thai provincial beauty pageant which selects a representative from Phitsanulok province to the Miss Grand Thailand national competition. It was founded in 2016 by a lance corporal, Krit Pondetwisai (กริช พลเดชวิสัย), as an inter-provincial pageant with other four provincial stages in the lower northern region.

Phitsanulok representatives have yet to win the Miss Grand Thailand title. The highest and only placement they obtained was in the top 20 finalists, achieved by Sukontha Jankhao and Ornchada Chaiyasarn in 2020 and 2025 respectively.

== History ==
In 2016, after Miss Grand Thailand began franchising the provincial competitions to individual organizers, who would name seventy-seven provincial titleholders to compete in the national pageant. The license for Phitsanulok province was granted to a local policeman, Krit Pondetwisai, who was also the licensee for other 4 lower northern stages, including Phichit, Uttaradit, Phetchabun, and Kamphaeng Phet. Pondetwisai co-organized the first Miss Grand Phichit with the mentioned 4 provicianl stages in Mueang Phitsanulok on April 17, 2016, and named Nicharee Chermrod the Phitsanulok's winner. The license was then transferred to another organizer team led by Kanoknat Likitpraiwan (กนกนาถ ลิขิตไพรวัลย์) the following year.

In addition to the 2016 edition, the pageant was also organized in parallel with another Miss Grand Thailand provincial stage, Miss Grand Uttaradit, in 2022. It was skipped once; in 2021, due to the COVID-19 pandemic in Thailand, the national organizer was unable to organize the national event, and the country representative for the international tournament was appointed instead.

Winner gallery

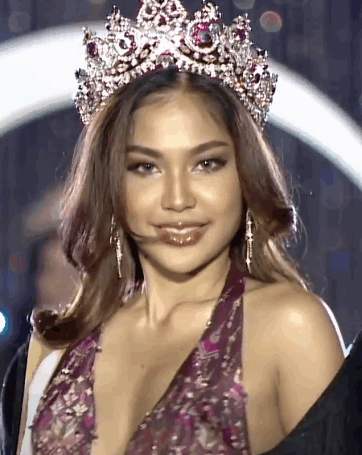
Yanisa Levisuth,
(2021/22)

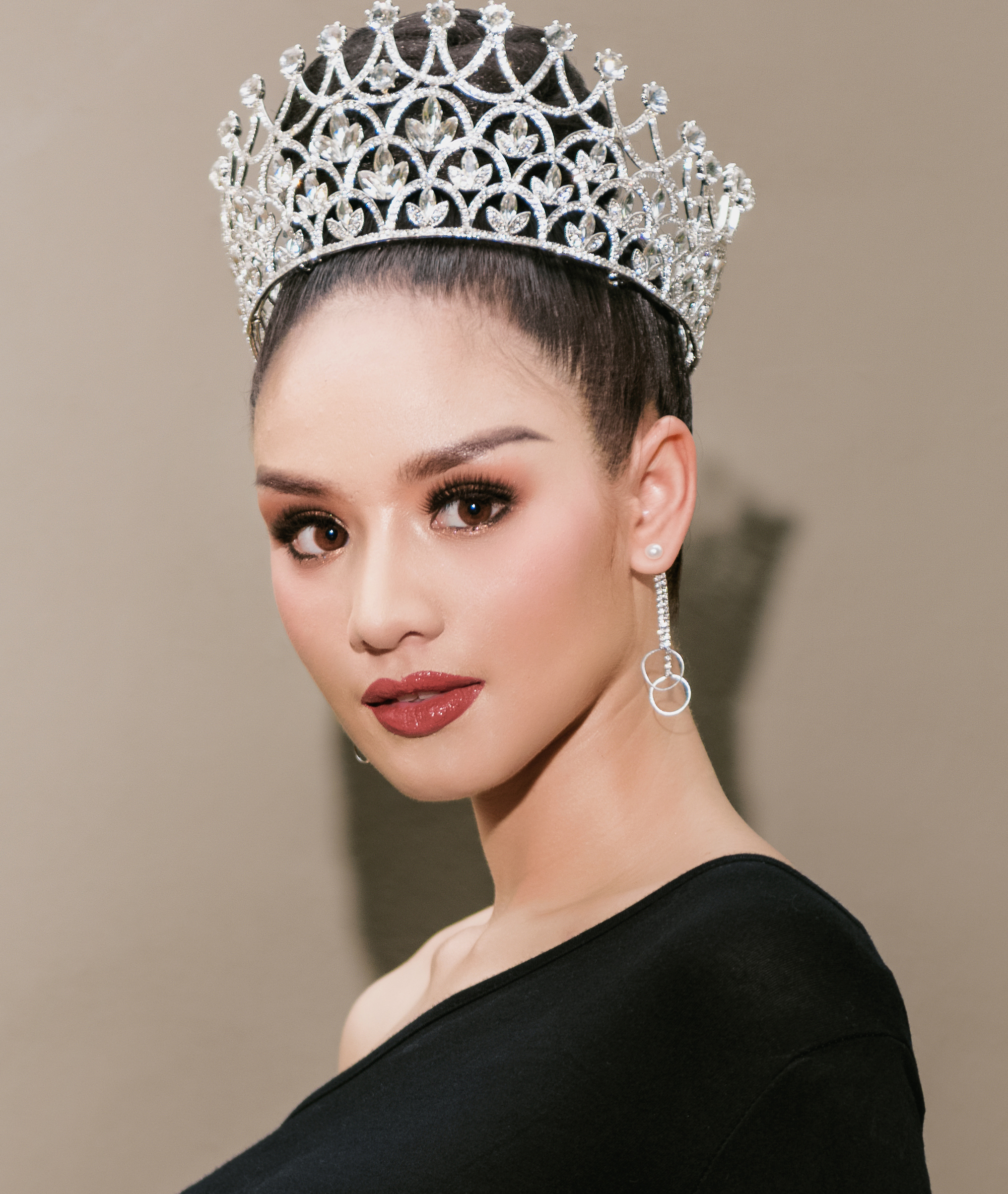
Ornchada Chaiyasarn
(2025)

== Editions ==
The following table details Miss Grand Phitsanulok's annual editions since 2016.

Edition	Date	Final venue	Entrants	Winner	Ref.
1st (Note: As an inter-provincial pageant for Miss Grand Phitsanulok–Uttaradit–Phetchabun–Phichit–Kamphaeng Phet.)	April 17, 2016	Phitsanulok Orchid Hotel, Mueang Phitsanulok, Phitsanulok	15	Nicharee Chermrod	
2nd	February 18, 2017	Central Phitsanulok, Mueang Phitsanulok, Phitsanulok	15	Nataree Intharaprasit	
3rd	April 18, 2018	Central Phitsanulok, Mueang Phitsanulok, Phitsanulok	15	Supang Phanthong	
4th	April 7, 2019	Amarin Lagoon Hotel, Mueang Phitsanulok, Phitsanulok	12	Areeya Noisuphap	
5th	July 18, 2020	Phutawan Resort Ban Rai, Noen Maprang, Phitsanulok	10	Sukontha Jankhao	
6th (Note: As an inter-provincial pageant for Miss Grand Phitsanulok–Uttaradit.)	January 31, 2022	Central Phitsanulok, Mueang Phitsanulok, Phitsanulok	16	Yanisa Lehwisut	
7th	November 30, 2022	Wangchan Riverview Hotel, Mueang Phitsanulok, Phitsanulok	10	Kenika Pakinsirikul	
8th	December 4, 2023	Mayflower Grande Hotel, Mueang Phitsanulok, Phitsanulok	7	Chutimon Sangsri-in	
9th	December 9, 2024	Central Phitsanulok, Mueang Phitsanulok, Phitsanulok	10	Ornchada Chaiyasarn	

== National competition ==
The following is a list of Phitsanulok representatives who competed at the Miss Grand Thailand pageant.

Year	Representative		Original provincial title	Placement at Miss Grand Thailand	Provincial director	Ref.
Year	Romanized name	Thai name	Original provincial title	Placement at Miss Grand Thailand	Provincial director	Ref.
2016	Nicharee Chermrod	ณิชารีย์ เจิมรอด	Miss Grand Phitsanulok 2016	Unplaced	Krit Pondetwisai	
2017	Nataree Intharaprasit	ณัฐรี อินทรประสิทธิ์	Miss Grand Phitsanulok 2017	Unplaced	Kanoknat Likitpraiwan	
2018	Supang Phanthong	สุภางค์ พานทอง	Miss Grand Phitsanulok 2018	Unplaced	Kanoknat Likitpraiwan	
2019	Areeya Noisuphap	อารีญา น้อยสุภาพ	Miss Grand Phitsanulok 2019	Unplaced	Juthatat Chantaninthon	
2020	Sukontha Jankhao	สุคนธา จันทร์ขาว	Miss Grand Phitsanulok 2020	Top 20	Juthatat Chantaninthon	
2021	No national pageant due to the COVID-19 pandemic.					
2022	Yanisa Lehwisut	ญาณิศา เล่ห์วิสุทธิ์	Miss Grand Phitsanulok 2021/22	Unplaced	Kanoknat Likitpraiwan	
2023	Kenika Pakinsirikul	เกณิกา ภาคิณศิริกุล	Miss Grand Phitsanulok 2023	Unplaced	Kanoknat Likitpraiwan	
2024	Chutimon Sangsri-in	ชุติมณฑน์ สังข์ศรีอินทร์	Miss Grand Phitsanulok 2024	Unplaced	Kanoknat Likitpraiwan	
2025	Ornchada Chaiyasarn	อรชดา ไชยสาร	Miss Grand Phitsanulok 2025	Top 20	Kanoknat Likitpraiwan	
