= Miss Grand Phichit =

Provincial pageant in Phichit, Thailand

Miss Grand ฺPhichit มิสแกรนด์พิจิตร
- Formation: April 17, 2016; 10 years ago
- Founder: Krit Pondetwisai
- Type: Beauty pageant
- Headquarters: Phichit
- Location: Thailand
- Official language: Thai
- Director: Thanat Bunsemsem (2025)
- Affiliations: Miss Grand Thailand

Summary result of Phichit representatives at Miss Grand Thailand
Placement	Number(s)
Winner	0
1st runner-up	0
2nd runner-up	0
3rd runner-up	0
4th runner-up	0
Top 10/11/12	1
Top 20/21	0
Unplaced	8

Miss Grand Phichit (Thai: มิสแกรนด์พิจิตร) is a Thai provincial beauty pageant which selects a representative from Phichit province to the Miss Grand Thailand national competition. It was founded in 2016 by a lance corporal, Krit Pondetwisai (กริช พลเดชวิสัย), as an inter-provincial pageant with other four provincial stages in the lower northern region.

Phichit representatives have yet to win the Miss Grand Thailand title. The highest and only placement they obtained was in the fifth runners-up team (Top 10), achieved by Piyarada Wayuweach in 2024.

== History ==
In 2016, after Miss Grand Thailand began franchising the provincial competitions to individual organizers, who would name seventy-seven provincial titleholders to compete in the national pageant. The license for Phichit province was granted to a local policeman, Krit Pondetwisai, who was also the licensee for other 4 lower northern stages, including Phitsanulok, Uttaradit, Phetchabun, and Kamphaeng Phet. Pondetwisai co-organized the first Miss Grand Phichit with the mentioned 4 provicianl stages in Mueang Phitsanulok on April 17, 2016, and named Aiyakan Chaiyakham (อัยการ ไชยาคำ) the Phichit's winner. The license was then transferred to another organizer team led by Thanakrit Saenwutthithanakul (ธนกฤต แสนวุฒิธนกุล) the following year.

The pageant was usually co-organized with other Miss Grand Thailand provincial stages; it was a stand-alone contest only for the 2017, 2018, 2019, and 2023 editions.

The pageant was skipped in 2022; due to the COVID-19 pandemic in Thailand, the national organizer was unable to organize the national event in 2021, the 2021 Miss Grand Kanchanaburi winner was sent to compete in the 2022 national stage instead.

Winner gallery

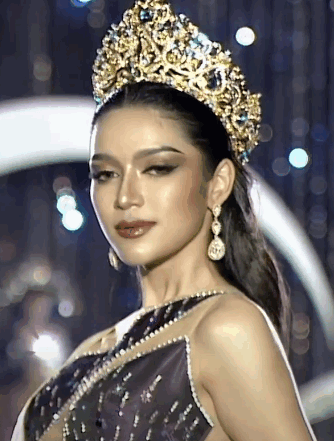
Nutthamon Kanthawong,
Miss Grand Phichit 2021/22

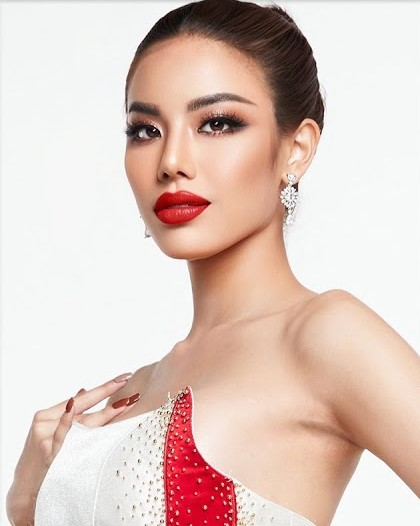
Tapimsiya Kasemwutrat,
Miss Grand Phichit 2023

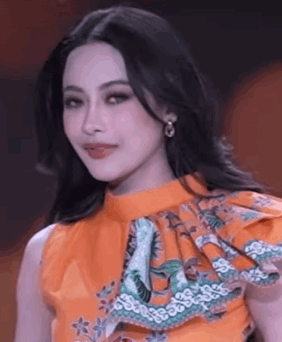
Pitchapa Saeng-aram,
Miss Grand Phichit 2025

== Editions ==
The following table details Miss Grand Phichit's annual editions since 2016.

Edition	Date	Final venue	Entrants	Winner	Ref.
1st (Note: As an inter-provincial pageant for Miss Grand Phitsanulok–Uttaradit–Phetchabun–Phichit–Kamphaeng Phet.)	April 17, 2016	Phitsanulok Orchid Hotel, Mueang Phitsanulok, Phitsanulok	15	Aiyakan Chaiyakham (Note: Later resigned, the pageant finalist Daorung Tothiang was elected as the replacement.)	
2nd	February 4, 2017	Bueng Si Fai Public Park, Mueang Phichit, Phichit	7	Jongkon Chok-in-plab	
3rd	May 27, 2018	CK Convention Hall, Mueang Phichit, Phichit	10	Mayura Chantree	
4th	March 16, 2019	Tops Plaza Phichit, Mueang Phichit, Phichit	5	Naphasakorn Modechang	
5th (Note: As an inter-provincial pageant for Miss Grand Phetchabun–Phichit.)	August 9, 2020	The Blue Sky Resort, Khao Kho, Phetchabun	12	Wilawan Kaeng-rit	
6th (Note: As an inter-provincial pageant for Miss Grand Nakhon Sawan–Phetchabun–Phichit.)	April 3, 2021	Breeze Hill Resort, Khao Kho, Phetchabun	20	Natthamon Kanthawong	
7th	December 23, 2022	Maya Lifestyle Shopping Center, Mueang Chiang Mai, Chiang Mai	10	Tapimsiya Kasemwutthirat	
8th (Note: As an inter-provincial pageant for Miss Grand Phichit–Chumphon.)	December 13, 2023	CDC Ballroom, Bang Kapi, Bangkok	10	Piyarada Wayuwet	
9th	August 4, 2024	Asgard Bangkok, Huai Khwang, Bangkok	14	Pitchapa Saeng-aram	

== National competition ==
The following is a list of Phichit representatives who competed at the Miss Grand Thailand pageant.

Year	Representative		Original provincial title	Placement at Miss Grand Thailand	Provincial director	Ref.
Year	Romanized name	Thai name	Original provincial title	Placement at Miss Grand Thailand	Provincial director	Ref.
2016	Daorung Tothiang	ดาวรุ่ง โตเที่ยง	Miss Grand Northern 2016 Finalist	Unplaced	Krit Pondetwisai	
2017	Jongkon Chok-in-plab	จงกล โชคอินพลับ	Miss Grand Phichit 2017	Unplaced	Thanakrit Saenwutthithanakul	
2018	Mayura Chantree	มยุรา จันทร์ตรี	Miss Grand Phichit 2018	Unplaced	Pakorn Temjai	
2019	Naphasakorn Modechang	นภสกร โหมดชัง	Miss Grand Phichit 2019	Unplaced	Natthamas Co., Ltd.	
2020	Wilawan Kaeng-rit	วิลาวัลย์ แขงฤทธิ์	Miss Grand Phichit 2020	Unplaced	Punnapat Sripakawadeepathumma	
2021	No national pageant due to the COVID-19 pandemic.					
2022	Natthamon Kanthawong	ณัฐมล กันทะวงค์	Miss Grand Phichit 2021/22	Unplaced	Unknown	
2023	Thapimsiya Kasemwutthirat	ธพิมพ์สิญา เกษมวุฒิรัช	Miss Grand Phichit 2023	Unplaced	Khomsan Phokasomboon	
2024	Piyarada Wayuwet	ปิยะรดา วายุเวช	Miss Grand Phichit 2024	5th runner-up	Marisa Klinphongsa	
2025	Pitchapa Saeng-aram	พิชชาภา แสงอร่าม	Miss Grand Phichit 2025	Unplaced	Thanat Bunsemsem	
