= Miss Grand Uttaradit =

Provincial pageant in Uttaradit, Thailand

Miss Grand Uttaradit มิสแกรนด์อุตรดิตถ์
- Formation: 17 April 2016; 10 years ago
- Founder: Krit Pondetwisai
- Type: Beauty pageant
- Headquarters: Uttaradit
- Location: Thailand
- Official language: Thai
- Director: Thatpakorn Wetwitchakorn (2025)
- Affiliations: Miss Grand Thailand

Summary result of Uttaradit representatives at Miss Grand Thailand
Placement	Number(s)
Winner	0
1st runner-up	0
2nd runner-up	0
3rd runner-up	0
4th runner-up	0
Top 10/11/12	0
Top 20/21	1
Unplaced	7

Miss Grand Uttaradit (Thai: มิสแกรนด์อุตรดิตถ์) is a Thai provincial beauty pageant which selects a representative from Uttaradit province to the Miss Grand Thailand national competition. It was founded in 2016 by a lance corporal, Krit Pondetwisai (กริช พลเดชวิสัย), as an inter-provincial pageant with other four provincial stages in the lower northern region.

Uttaradit representatives have yet to win the Miss Grand Thailand title. The highest and only placement they obtained was in the top 10 finalists, achieved by Srisawan Sukhiwat in 2020.

== History ==
In 2016, after Miss Grand Thailand began franchising the provincial competitions to individual organizers, who would name seventy-seven provincial titleholders to compete in the national pageant. The license for Uttaradit province was granted to a local policeman, Krit Pondetwisai, who was also the licensee for other 4 lower northern stages, including Phichit, Phitsanulok, Phetchabun, and Kamphaeng Phet. Pondetwisai co-organized the first Miss Grand Phichit with the mentioned 4 provicianl stages in Mueang Phitsanulok on April 17, 2016, and named Jenjira Prakasit (เจนจิรา ประกาศิต) the Uttaradit's winner. The license was then transferred to another organizer team led by Akaradit Hemthanakitpokin (อัครดิษฐ์ เหมธนกิจโภคิน) the following year.

In addition to the 2016 edition, the pageant was also organized in parallel with other Miss Grand Thailand provincial stages in 2019 with Sukhothai and 2022 with Miss Grand Phitsanulok.

The pageant was skipped once; in 2021, due to the COVID-19 pandemic in Thailand, the national organizer was unable to organize the national event, and the country representative for the international tournament was appointed instead.

Winner gallery

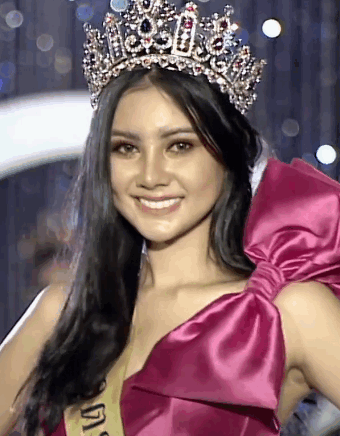
Jintana Nimthong,
Miss Grand Uttaradit 2021/22

== Editions ==
The following table details Miss Grand Uttaradit's annual editions since 2016.

Edition	Date	Final venue	Entrants	Winner	Ref.
1st (Note: As an inter-provincial pageant for Miss Grand Phitsanulok–Uttaradit–Phetchabun–Phichit–Kamphaeng Phet.)	April 17, 2016	Phitsanulok Orchid Hotel, Mueang Phitsanulok, Phitsanulok	15	Jenjira Prakasit (Note: Later resigned, and the pageant finalist, Chutikarn Singh-ro, was elected as the replacement.)	
2nd	May 20, 2017	Seeharaj Hotel, Mueang Uttaradit, Uttaradit	8	Kamanchanok Kanbua (Note: Dethroned after finishing the national competition, the 1st runner-up Parinya Yotket (ปริญญา ยอดเกตุ) was elected as the replacement.)	
3rd	April 29, 2018	Uttaradit Rajabhat University Auditorium, Mueang Uttaradit, Uttaradit	8	Kanokporn Nimpensook	
4th (Note: As an inter-provincial pageant for Miss Grand Sukhothai–Uttaradit.)	May 25, 2019	Sukhothai Orchid Hotel, Mueang Sukhothai, Sukhothai	12	Zareen Tipviang	
5th	July 26, 2020	Sripong Park Supermarket, Mueang Uttaradit, Uttaradit	8	Srisawan Sukhiwat	
6th (Note: As an inter-provincial pageant for Miss Grand Phitsanulok–Uttaradit.)	January 31, 2022	Central Phitsanulok, Mueang Phitsanulok, Phitsanulok	16	Jintana Nimthong	
7th	January 29, 2023	Friday Department Store, Mueang Uttaradit, Uttaradit	9	Jessica Chairin	
8th	November 11, 2023	Phraya Phichai Dab Hak Stadium, Mueang Uttaradit, Uttaradit	9	Orapun Pechneam	
9th	October 10, 2024	Sripong Park Supermarket, Mueang Uttaradit, Uttaradit	8	Ampika Butdawong (Note: Later resigned.)	

== National competition ==
The following is a list of Uttaradit representatives who competed at the Miss Grand Thailand pageant.

Year	Representative		Original provincial title	Placement at Miss Grand Thailand	Provincial director	Ref.
Year	Romanized name	Thai name	Original provincial title	Placement at Miss Grand Thailand	Provincial director	Ref.
2016	Chutikarn Singh-ro	ชุติกาญจน์ สิงห์รอ	Miss Grand Northern 2016 finalist	Unplaced	Krit Pondetwisai	
2017	Kamanchanok Kanbua	กมณชนก ก้านบัว	Miss Grand Uttaradit 2017	Unplaced	Akaradit Hemthanakitpokin	
2018	Kanokporn Nimpensook	กนกพร นิ่มเป็นสุข	Miss Grand Uttaradit 2018	Unplaced	Pakorn Temjai	
2019	Zareen Tipviang	ซารีน ทิพย์เวียง	Miss Grand Uttaradit 2019	Unplaced	Thananan Kaewpuang	
2020	Srisawan Sukhiwat	ศรีสวรรค์ สุขีวัต	Miss Grand Uttaradit 2020	Top 10	Nattawut Champaphrai	
2021	No national pageant due to the COVID-19 pandemic.					
2022	Jintana Nimthong	จินตนา นิ่มทอง	Miss Grand Uttaradit 2021/22	Unplaced	Juthathat Janthaninthon	
2023	Jessica Chairin	เจสสิก้า ชัยรินทร์	Miss Grand Uttaradit 2023	Unplaced	Juthathat Janthaninthon	
2024	Orapun Pechneam	อรพรรณ เพชรเนียม	Miss Grand Uttaradit 2024	Unplaced	Juthathat Janthaninthon	
2025	Ampika Butdawong	อัมพิกา บุตรดาวงศ์	Miss Grand Uttaradit 2025	Resigned	Thatpakorn Wetwitchakorn	
2025	Abhinya Phiamdee	อภิญญา เปี่ยมดี	2nd runner-up Miss Grand Uttaradit 2025		Thatpakorn Wetwitchakorn	
