= Miss Grand Chumphon =

Provincial pageant in Chumphon, Thailand

Miss Grand Chumphon มิสแกรนด์ชุมพร
- Formation: May 6, 2017; 9 years ago
- Founder: Montri Siriwatanavarakorn
- Type: Beauty pageant
- Headquarters: Chumphon
- Location: Thailand
- Members: Miss Grand Thailand
- Official language: Thai
- Provincial Director: Phachisa Penpakdee

Summary result of Chumphon representatives at Miss Grand Thailand
| Placement | Number(s) |
|---|---|
| Winner | 1 |
| 1st runner-up | 0 |
| 2nd runner-up | 1 |
| 3rd runner-up | 0 |
| 4th runner-up | 0 |
| Top 10/11/12 | 1 |
| Top 20 | 2 |

Miss Grand Chumphon (Thai: มิสแกรนด์ชุมพร) is a Thai provincial beauty pageant which selects a representative from Chumphon province for the Miss Grand Thailand national competition, founded in 2017, by a Chumphon-based tutor, Montri Siriwatanavarakorn (มนตรี ศิริวัฒนาวรากร).

Since the first competition in the Miss Grand Thailand pageant in 2016, Chumphon's representatives won the main title once; in 2023 by Thaweeporn Phingchamrat, and was placed the second runner-up once; in 2024, by Kittiyaporn Fungmee.

== History ==
In 2016, after Miss Grand Thailand began franchising the provincial competitions to individual organizers, who would name seventy-seven provincial titleholders to compete in the national pageant, the license for Chumphon province was purchased by a local entrepreneur, Natthawut Ninyakanon (ณัตธวุฒิ นิลยกานนท์), but the first representative was appointed. Later in 2017, Ninyakanon lost the franchise to another local organizer Montri Siriwatanavarakorn (มนตรี ศิริวัฒนาวรากร), who organized the first Miss Grand Chumphon competition on 6 May 2017, in which an airline business management student from the University of the Thai Chamber of Commerce, Techini Kalong, was named the winner.

The pageant was skipped once; in 2021, due to the COVID-19 pandemic in Thailand, the national organizer was unable to organize the national event, and the country representative for the international tournament was appointed instead.

Winner gallery

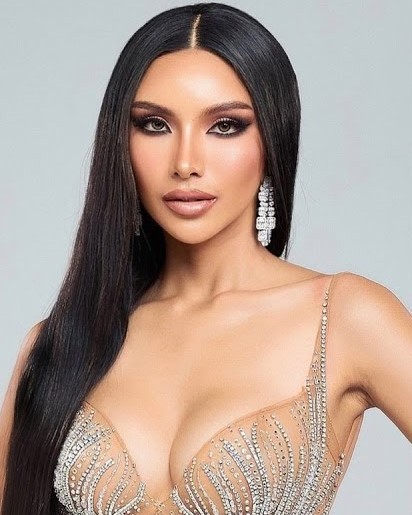
Juthamas Mekseree
Miss Grand Chumphon 2019

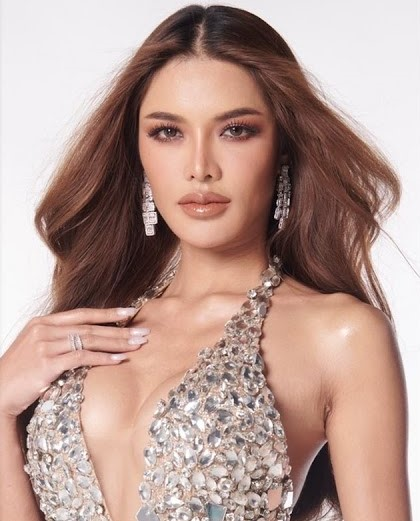
Thaweeporn Phingchamrat
Miss Grand Chumphon 2023

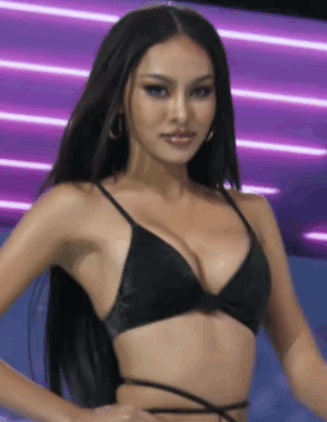
Kittiyaporn Fungmee
Miss Grand Chumphon 2024

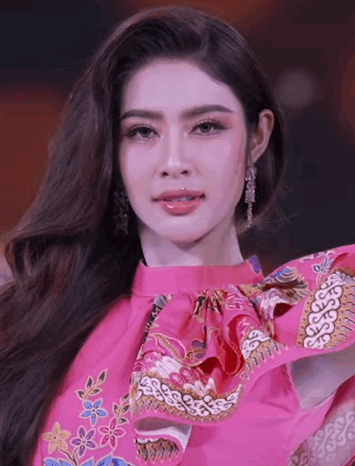
Suphannika Nopparat
Miss Grand Chumphon 2025

== Editions ==
The following table details Miss Grand Chumphon's annual editions since 2016.

| Edition | Date | Final venue | Entrants | Winner | Ref. |
|---|---|---|---|---|---|
| 1st | 6 May 2017 | Nana Buri Hotel, Chumphon | 14 | Techini Kalong | |
| 2nd | 6 May 2018 | Grand Ballroom, Loft Mania Boutique Hotel, Chumphon | 12 | Salittaya Rak-rod | |
| 3rd (Note: Held in parallel with the Miss Grand Ranong 2019 pageant.) | 19 May 2019 | Tinidee Hotel, Ranong | 8 | Juthamat Mekseree | |
| 4th | 6 August 2020 | Novotel Chumphon Beach Resort & Golf, Chumphon | 10 | Pa-ornrat Pinmuang | |
| 5th | 27 February 2022 | Nana Buri Hotel, Chumphon | 6 | Charlotte Austin | |
| 6th (Note: Held in parallel with the Miss Grand Trang 2023 pageant.) | 27 December 2022 | MGI Hall, Show DC Megacomplex, Bangkok | 17 | Thaweeporn Phingchamrat | |
| 7th (Note: Held in parallel with the Miss Grand Phichit 2024 pageant.) | 13 December 2023 | CDC Ballroom, Bang Kapi, Bangkok | 10 | Kittiyaporn Fungmee | |
| 8th (Note: Held in parallel with the Miss Grand Phichit 2025 pageant.) | 25 May 2024 | Asgard Bangkok, Huai Khwang, Bangkok | 14 | Suphannika Nopparat | |

== National competition ==
The following is a list of Chumphon representatives who competed at the Miss Grand Thailand pageant.

| Year | Representative | | Original provincial title | Placement at Miss Grand Thailand | Provincial director | Ref. |
| Year | Romanized name | Thai name | Original provincial title | Placement at Miss Grand Thailand | Provincial director | Ref. |
|---|---|---|---|---|---|---|
| 2016 | Kamonchanok Kanbua | กมณชนก ก้านบัว | Appointed | Unplaced | Natthawut Ninyakanon | |
| 2017 | Techini Kalong | เตชินี กาหลง | Miss Grand Chumphon 2017 | Unplaced | Montri Siriwatanavarakorn | |
| 2018 | Salittaya Rak-rod | สลิตญา รักรอด | Miss Grand Chumphon 2018 | Unplaced | Chalong Konglikit | |
| 2019 | Juthamas Mekseree | จุฑามาศ เมฆเสรี | Miss Grand Chumphon 2019 | Top 20 | Chalong Konglikit | |
| 2020 | Pa-ornrat Pinmuang | ปอรรัตน์ ปิ่นเมือง | Miss Grand Chumphon 2020 | Unplaced | Dedcharat Chaipung | |
| 2022 | Charlotte Austin | ชาล็อต ออสติน | Miss Grand Chumphon 2022 | 5th runners-up | Yuttana Boondee | |
| 2023 | Thaweeporn Phingchamrat | ทวีพร พริ้งจำรัส | Miss Grand Chumphon 2023 | Winner | Piriya Seannok | |
| 2024 | Kittiyaporn Fungmee | กิตติยาพร ฟุ้งมี | Miss Grand Chumphon 2024 | 2nd runner-up | Phachisa Penpakdee | |
| 2025 | Suphannika Nopparat | สุพรรณิการ์ นพรัตน์ | Miss Grand Chumphon 2025 | 5th runners-up | Phachisa Penpakdee | |
| 2026 | Rindares Akresasiriphan | รินทร์ดาเรศ อัคเรศศิรพรรณ | Miss Grand Chumphon 2026 | Top 20 | Phachisa Penpakdee | |
