= Miss Grand Bueng Kan =

Provincial pageant in Bueng Kan, Thailand

Miss Grand Bueng Kan มิสแกรนด์บึงกาฬ
- Formation: April 19, 2016; 10 years ago
- Founder: Surachet Chaiwong
- Type: Beauty pageant
- Headquarters: Bueng Kan
- Location: Thailand
- Official language: Thai
- Director: Nattapon Poolkhetkrom (2025)
- Affiliations: Miss Grand Thailand

Summary result of Bueng Kan representatives at Miss Grand Thailand
| Placement | Number(s) |
|---|---|
| Winner | 0 |
| 1st runner-up | 0 |
| 2nd runner-up | 0 |
| 3rd runner-up | 0 |
| 4th runner-up | 0 |
| Top 10/11/12 | 0 |
| Top 20/21 | 2 |
| Unplaced | 6 |

Miss Grand Bueng Kan (Thai: มิสแกรนด์บึงกาฬ) is a Thai provincial beauty pageant which selects a representative from Bueng Kan province to the Miss Grand Thailand national competition. It was founded in 2016 by an education personnel Surachet Chaiwong (สุรเชษฐ ชัยวงศ์).

Bueng Kan representatives have yet to win the Miss Grand Thailand title. The highest placement they obtained was in the top 20 finalists, achieved in 2017 and 2019 by Sopinat Makphon and Anussara Panya, respectively.

== History ==
In 2016, after Miss Grand Thailand began franchising the provincial competitions to individual organizers, who would name seventy-seven provincial titleholders to compete in the national pageant. The license for Bueng Kan province was granted to a vocational teacher from Chiang Mai, Surachet Chaiwong, who organized the first Miss Grand Bueng Kan pageant in Mueang Bueng Kan on April 19, 2016, and named a 24-year-old Bangkok-based entrepreneur Buppa Nilsawat the winner. Chaiwong relinquished the license to Natthaphong Khemsiri (ณัฐพงษ์ เข็มศิริ) the following year.

The pageant was usually co-organized with other provincial pageants, such as Miss Grand Nong Khai in 2017 and 2019, and Miss Grand Nong Khai–Nong Bua Lamphu in 2020. It was organized in Bueng Kan province only in 2016 and 2018; the reaming editions happened in other provinces.

The pageant was skipped once; in 2021, due to the COVID-19 pandemic in Thailand, the national organizer was unable to organize the national event, and the country representative for the international tournament was appointed instead.

Winner gallery

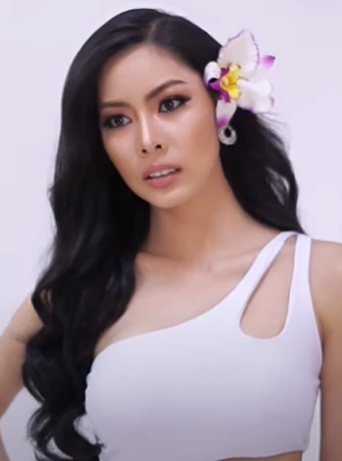
Sumintra Chudchonnabot,
Miss Grand Bueng Kan 2022

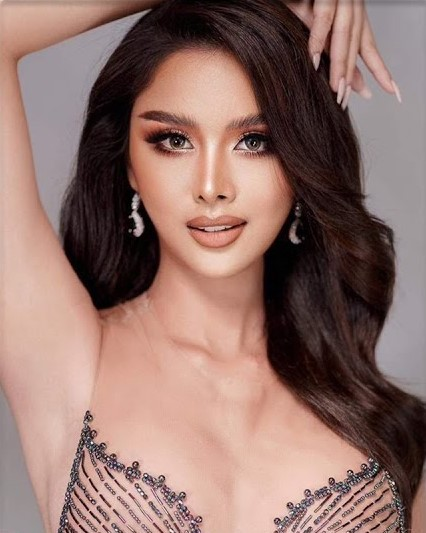
Witchuda Jakwiset,
Miss Grand Bueng Kan 2023

== Editions ==
The following table details Miss Grand Bueng Kan's annual editions since 2016.

| Edition | Date | Final venue | Entrants | Winner | Ref. |
|---|---|---|---|---|---|
| 1st | April 19, 2016 | The One Hotel, Mueang Bueng Kan, Bueng Kan | 12 | Buppa Nilsawat | |
| 2nd (Note: As an inter-provincial pageant for Miss Grand Nong Khai–Bueng Kan.) | May 13, 2017 | Nongkhai Tavilla & Convention Center, Mueang Nong Khai, Nong Khai | 15 | Sopinat Makphon | |
| 3rd | May 12, 2018 | The One Hotel, Mueang Bueng Kan, Bueng Kan | 8 | Rapeephan Nasingthong | |
| 4th | May 25, 2019 | Royal Nakhara Hotel and Convention Centre, Mueang Nong Khai, Nong Khai | 9 | Anussara Panya | |
| 5th (Note: As an inter-provincial pageant for Miss Grand Nong Khai–Nong Bua Lamphu–Bueng Kan.) | August 2, 2020 | Sriboonruang Wittayakarn School, Si Bun Rueang, Nong Bua Lamphu | 20 | Suwatcharaporn Chinkam | |
| 6th (Note: As an inter-provincial pageant for Miss Grand Loei–Nong Bua Lamphu–Bueng Kan–Sakon Nakhon.) | January 16, 2022 | Loei Palace Hotel, Mueang Loei, Loei | 18 | Sumintra Chutchonnabot | |
| 7th | February 27, 2023 | Rimrang Station Openhall, Mueang Khon Kaen, Khon Kaen | 10 | Witchuda Chakwiset | |
| 8th | January 28, 2024 | Royal Orchid Sheraton Hotel & Towers, Bang Rak, Bangkok | 7 | Yonrada Watjana | |

== National competition ==
The following is a list of Bueng Kan representatives who competed at the Miss Grand Thailand pageant.

| Year | Representative | | Original provincial title | Placement at Miss Grand Thailand | Provincial director | Ref. |
| Year | Romanized name | Thai name | Original provincial title | Placement at Miss Grand Thailand | Provincial director | Ref. |
|---|---|---|---|---|---|---|
| 2016 | Buppa Nilsawat | บุปผา นิลสวัสดิ์ | Miss Grand Bueng Kan 2016 | Unplaced | Surachet Chaiwong | |
| 2017 | Sopinat Makphon | โสภิณัฐ มรรคผล | Miss Grand Bueng Kan 2017 | Top 20 | Natthaphong Khemsiri | |
| 2018 | Rapeephan Nasingthong | ระพีพรรณ นาสิงทอง | Miss Grand Bueng Kan 2018 | Unplaced | Jet Ketjamnong | |
| 2019 | Anussara Panya | อนุสรา ปัญญา | Miss Grand Bueng Kan 2019 | Top 20 | Unknown | |
| 2020 | Suwatcharaporn Chinkam | สุวัชราภรณ์ จีนคำ | Miss Grand Bueng Kan 2020 | Unplaced | Pitsada Songklod | |
| 2021 | No national pageant due to the COVID-19 pandemic. | | | | | |
| 2022 | Sumintra Chutchonnabot | สุมินตรา ชุดชนบท | Miss Grand Bueng Kan 2021/22 | Unplaced | Thananan Kaewpuang | |
| 2023 | Witchuda Chakwiset | วิชชุดา จักรวิเศษ | Miss Grand Bueng Kan 2023 | Unplaced | Sumapone Chaikam | |
| 2024 | Yonrada Watjana | ยลรดา วัจนะ | Miss Grand Bueng Kan 2024 | Unplaced | Sumapone Chaikam | |
| 2025 | | | Miss Grand Bueng Kan 2025 | | Nattapon Poolkhetkrom | |
