= Miss Grand Sakon Nakhon =

Provincial pageant in Sakon Nakhon, Thailand

Miss Grand ฺSakon Nakhon มิสแกรนด์สกลนคร
- Formation: April 30, 2016; 10 years ago
- Founder: Amnat Chaiyabut
- Type: Beauty pageant
- Headquarters: Sakon Nakhon
- Location: Thailand
- Official language: Thai
- Director: Thanlada Sukasam (2025)
- Affiliations: Miss Grand Thailand

Summary result of Sakon Nakhon representatives at Miss Grand Thailand
Placement	Number(s)
Winner	0
1st runner-up	0
2nd runner-up	1
3rd runner-up	0
4th runner-up	0
Top 10/11/12	1
Top 20/21	0
Unplaced	7

Miss Grand Sakon Nakhon (Thai: มิสแกรนด์สกลนคร) is a Thai provincial beauty pageant which selects a representative from Sakon Nakhon province to the Miss Grand Thailand national competition. It was founded in 2016 by a local organizer Amnat Chaiyabut (อำนาจ ไชยบุศย์).

Sakon Nakhon representatives have yet to win the Miss Grand Thailand title. The highest placement they obtained was the second runner-up, won in 2018 by Ingchanok Prasart.

== History ==
In 2016, after Miss Grand Thailand began franchising the provincial competitions to individual organizers, who would name seventy-seven provincial titleholders to compete in the national pageant. The license for Sakon Nakhon province was granted to an event organizer Amnat Chaiyabut, who was also the licensee for other 4 Isan contests, including Khon Kaen, Nong Bua Lamphu, Udon Thani, and Loei. The first Miss Grand Sakon Nakhon was co-organized with the four mentioned contests on April 30, 2016, in Mueang Udon Thani, where Marisa Phonthirat was named Miss Grand Sakon Nakhon.

The pageant was sometimes co-organized with other provincial pageants. It was organized in Sakon Nakhon province only from 2017 to 2019, and in 2023; the remaining editions happened in other provinces.

The pageant was skipped once; in 2021, due to the COVID-19 pandemic in Thailand, the national organizer was unable to organize the national event, and the country representative for the international tournament was appointed instead.

Winner gallery

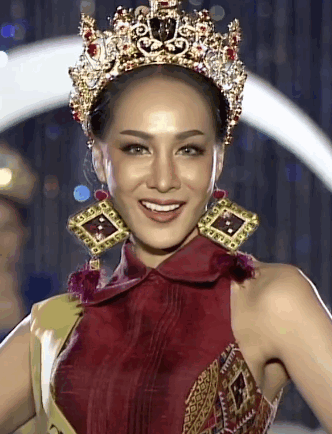
Aroonluck Mothaneechiyachoke,
Miss Grand Sakon Nakhon 2022

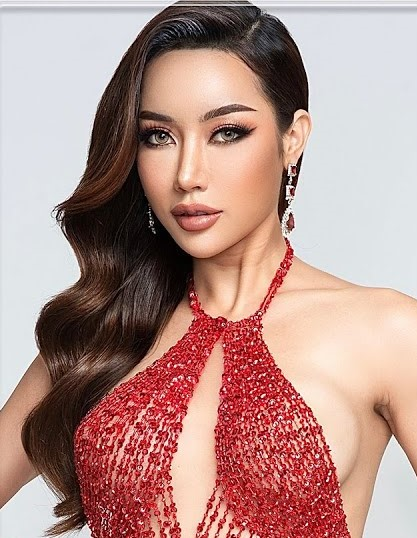
Chompunut Nanudon,
Miss Grand Sakon Nakhon 2023

== Editions ==
The following table details Miss Grand Sakon Nakhon's annual editions since 2016.

Edition	Date	Final venue	Entrants	Winner	Ref.
1st (Note: As an inter-provincial pageant for Miss Grand Udon Thani–Khon Kaen–Loei–Nong Bua Lamphu–Sakon Nakhon.)	April 30, 2016	Napalai Hotel, Mueang Udon Thani, Udon Thani	20	Marisa Phonthirat	
2nd	April 29, 2017	Robinson Lifestyle Sakon Nakhon, Mueang Sakon Nakhon, Sakon Nakhon	21	Nicharee Bunsiri	
3rd	May 19, 2018	Robinson Lifestyle Sakon Nakhon, Mueang Sakon Nakhon, Sakon Nakhon	15	Ingchanok Prasart	
4th	May 12, 2019	Robinson Lifestyle Sakon Nakhon, Mueang Sakon Nakhon, Sakon Nakhon	12	Kanokporn Makphonsombat	
5th (Note: As an inter-provincial pageant for Miss Grand Udon Thani–Sakon Nakhon.)	July 26, 2020	Montatip Hall, Mueang Udon Thani, Udon Thani	19	Paweephon Wisansatbamrung	
6th (Note: As an inter-provincial pageant for Miss Grand Sakon Nakhon–Nong Bua Lamphu–Bueng Kan–Loei.)	January 16, 2022	Loei Palace Hotel, Mueang Loei, Loei	18	Arunluck Motaneechaichok	
7th	February 28, 2023	Imperial Sakon Hotel, Mueang Sakon Nakhon, Sakon Nakhon	11	Chompunut Naen-udon	
8th	January 20, 2024	Central Chaengwattana, Pak Kret, Nonthaburi	14	Napapat Rungroj	

== National competition ==
The following is a list of Sakon Nakhon representatives who competed at the Miss Grand Thailand pageant.

Year	Representative		Original provincial title	Placement at Miss Grand Thailand	Provincial director	Ref.
Year	Romanized name	Thai name	Original provincial title	Placement at Miss Grand Thailand	Provincial director	Ref.
2016	Marisa Phonthirat	มาริษา พลธิราช	Miss Grand Sakon Nakhon 2016	Unplaced	Amnat Chaiyabut	
2017	Nicharee Bunsiri	ณิชารีย์ บุญศิริ	Miss Grand Sakon Nakhon 2017	Unplaced	Jakkrit Parito	
2018	Ingchanok Prasart	อิงชนก ประสาตร์	Miss Grand Sakon Nakhon 2018	2nd runner-up	Kanyarat Charukornchindarat	
2019	Kanokporn Makphonsombat	กนกภรณ์ มรรคผลสมบัติ	Miss Grand Sakon Nakhon 2019	Unplaced	Kritthaphon Nateebaworn	
2020	Paweephon Wisansatbamrung	ปวีณ์พร วิศาลศาสตร์บำรุง	Miss Grand Sakon Nakhon 2020	Unplaced	Yuranun Juntaya	
2021	No national pageant due to the COVID-19 pandemic.					
2022	Arunluck Motaneechaichok	อรุณลักษณ์ โมทะนีชัยโชค	Miss Grand Sakon Nakhon 2021/22	Unplaced	Thananan Kaewpuang	
2023	Chompunut Naen-udon	ชมพูนุท แน่นอุดร	Miss Grand Sakon Nakhon 2023	Unplaced	Chaitanin Sripraingam	
2024	Napapat Rungroj	ณปภัช รุ่งโรจน์	Miss Grand Sakon Nakhon 2024	5th runner-up	Wachira Poonsawat	
2025	Kalyanat Prasomsri	กัลยาณัฐ ประสมศรี	Miss Grand Sakon Nakhon 2025	Unplaced	Thanlada Sukasam	
