= Miss Grand Ubon Ratchathani =

Provincial pageant in Ubon Ratchathani, Thailand

Miss Grand Ubon Ratchathani มิสแกรนด์อุบลราชธานี
- Formation: May 8, 2016; 9 years ago
- Founder: Nontat Nithipanich
- Type: Beauty pageant
- Headquarters: Ubon Ratchathani
- Location: Thailand
- Official language: Thai
- Director: Thanyarat Soda (2025)
- Affiliations: Miss Grand Thailand

Summary result of Ubon Ratchathani representatives at Miss Grand Thailand
Placement	Number(s)
Winner	0
1st runner-up	0
2nd runner-up	0
3rd runner-up	0
4th runner-up	0
Top 10/11/12	3
Top 20/21	1
Unplaced	4

Miss Grand Ubon Ratchathani (Thai: มิสแกรนด์อุบลราชธานี) is a Thai provincial beauty pageant which selects a representative from Ubon Ratchathani province to the Miss Grand Thailand national competition. It was founded in 2016 by an entrepreneur, Nontat Nithipanich (นนทัช นิธิพานิช).

Ubon Ratchathani representatives have yet to win the Miss Grand Thailand title. The highest placement they obtained was in the top 10 finalists, achieved in 2016, 2019, and 2020.

== History ==
In 2016, after Miss Grand Thailand began franchising the provincial competitions to individual organizers, who would name seventy-seven provincial titleholders to compete in the national pageant. The license for Ubon Ratchathani province was granted to a local entrepreneur, Nontat Nithipanich, who organized the first Miss Grand Ubon Ratchathani contest in that year on 8 May and named a model from Warin Chamrap, Chanita Chantanet, the winner. Nithipanich relinquished the franchised to a producer from Sisaket province, Awirut Akkabut, in 2020.

The pageant was sometimes co-organized with other Miss Grand Thailand's provincial stages; in 2020 with Miss Grand Sisaket and 2025 with Miss Grand Phetchabun. Due to the cancellation of the 2021 national event, the 2021 Miss Grand Ubon Ratchathani winner was sent to compete in the 2022 national pageant instead, resulting in the skip of the 2022 provincial pageant.

Winner gallery

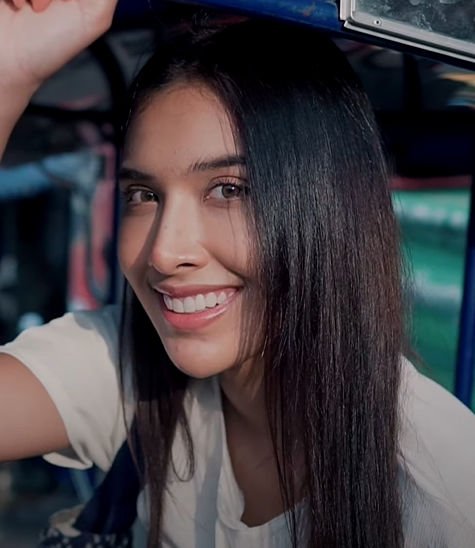
Atiya Meeseephong,
Miss Grand Ubon Ratchathani 2021/22

== Editions ==
The following table details Miss Grand Ubon Ratchathani's annual editions since 2016.

Edition	Date	Final venue	Entrants	Winner	Ref.
1st	8 May 2016	Sunee Grand Hotel and Convention Center, Mueang, Ubon Ratchathani	20	Chanita Chantanet	
2nd	30 May 2017	Sunee Grand Hotel and Convention Center, Mueang, Ubon Ratchathani	16	Supassorn Sairak	
3rd	29 April 2018	Sunee Grand Hotel and Convention Center, Mueang, Ubon Ratchathani	29	Athitaya Unkaew	
4th	19 May 2019	Sunee Grand Hotel and Convention Center, Mueang, Ubon Ratchathani	10	Sirirat Na-ubon	
5th (Note: As an inter-provincial pageant for Miss Grand Ubon Ratchathani–Sisaket.)	20 July 2020	Sipruetthalai Hotel, Mueang, Sisaket	12	Chutiya Chiarakul	
6th	24 April 2021	President Building, UMT, Mueang, Ubon Ratchathani	20	Atiya Meeseephong	
7th	19 February 2023	Centara Ubon, Mueang, Ubon Ratchathani	13	Patcharanan Chantem	
8th	31 January 2024	CentralPlaza Ubon, Mueang, Ubon Ratchathani	15	Patimaporn Khayanchom	
9th (Note: As an inter-provincial pageant for Miss Grand Ubon Ratchathani–Phetchabun.)	2 November 2024	Sunee Grand Hotel and Convention Center, Mueang, Ubon Ratchathani	15	Wanlapha Kanyama	

== National competition ==
The following is a list of Ubon Ratchathani representatives who competed at the Miss Grand Thailand pageant.

Year	Representative		Original provincial title	Placement at Miss Grand Thailand	Provincial director	Ref.
Year	Romanized name	Thai name	Original provincial title	Placement at Miss Grand Thailand	Provincial director	Ref.
2016	Chanita Chantanet	ชนิตา จันทเนตร	Miss Grand Ubon Ratchathani 2016	Top 10	Nontat Nithipanich	
2017	Supassorn Sairak	สุภัสสร สายรักษ์	Miss Grand Ubon Ratchathani 2017	Top 20	Nontat Nithipanich	
2018	Athitaya Unkaew	อาทิตยา อุ่นแก้ว	Miss Grand Ubon Ratchathani 2018	Unplaced	Nontat Nithipanich	
2019	Sirirat Na-ubon	ศิริรัตน์ ณะอุบล	Miss Grand Ubon Ratchathani 2019	Top 10	Nontat Nithipanich	
2020	Chutiya Chiarakul	ชุติญา เจียรกุล	Miss Grand Ubon Ratchathani 2020	Top 10	Awirut Akkabut	
2021	No national pageant due to the COVID-19 pandemic.					
2022	Atiya Meeseephong	อติญา มีสีผ่อง	Miss Grand Ubon Ratchathani 2021/22	Unplaced	Naphat Chiarakul	
2023	Patcharanan Chantem	พัชรนันต์ จันทร์เต็ม	Miss Grand Ubon Ratchathani 2023	Unplaced	Pitakchai Chitjan	
2024	Patimaporn Khayanchom	ปฎิมาภรณ์ ขยันชม	Miss Grand Ubon Ratchathani 2024	Unplaced	Pitakchai Chitjan	
2025	Wanlapha Kanyama	วัลภา กันยามา	Miss Grand Ubon Ratchathani 2025	Unplaced	Thanyarat Soda	
