= Miss Grand Samut Prakan =

Provincial pageant in Samut Prakan, Thailand

Miss Grand ฺSamut Prakan มิสแกรนด์สมุทปราการ
- Formation: May 5, 2017; 8 years ago
- Founder: Pitakchai Chitjan; Supharat Thammasarot
- Type: Beauty pageant
- Headquarters: Samut Prakan
- Location: Thailand
- Official language: Thai
- Provincial Director: Patiya Nimnoi (2021–present)
- Affiliations: Miss Grand Thailand

Summary result of Samut Prakan representatives at Miss Grand Thailand
Placement	Number(s)
Winner	0
1st runner-up	0
2nd runner-up	0
3rd runner-up	0
4th runner-up	0
Top 10/11/12	0
Top 20	0
Unplaced	9

Miss Grand Samut Prakan (Thai: มิสแกรนด์สมุทรปราการ) is a Thai provincial beauty pageant which selects a representative from Samut Prakan province to the Miss Grand Thailand national competition. It was founded in 2017 by an organizer team led by Pitakchai Chitjan (พิทักษ์ชัย จิตจันทร์) and Supharat Thammasarot (ศุภรัตน์ ธรรมสโรจน์).

Samut Prakan representatives have yet to secure a spot in the Miss Grand Thailand national contest.

== History ==
In 2016, after Miss Grand Thailand began franchising the provincial competitions to individual organizers, who would name seventy-seven provincial titleholders to compete in the national pageant, the license for Samut Prakan province was obtained by Pitakchai Chitjan and Supharat Thammasarot, who assigned her daughter, Avika Thammasarot, as the province representative to compete nationally. Under their directorship, the first Miss Grand Samut Prakan contest took place the following year on 5 May in Mueang Samut Prakan, where a Thai-French model, Chatthira Michas, was named the winner. However, Michas was later dethroned and the 1st runner-up was assigned as the replacement in the national contest.

The competition license was transferred to Nanyaphat Kotchasan and Patiya Nimnoi, in 2020 and 2021, respectively. Nimnoi is also the licensee of Miss Grand Prachuap Khiri Khan since 2023.

The pageant was skipped once; in 2021, due to the COVID-19 pandemic in Thailand, the national organizer was unable to organize the national event, and the country representative for the international tournament was appointed instead.

Winner gallery

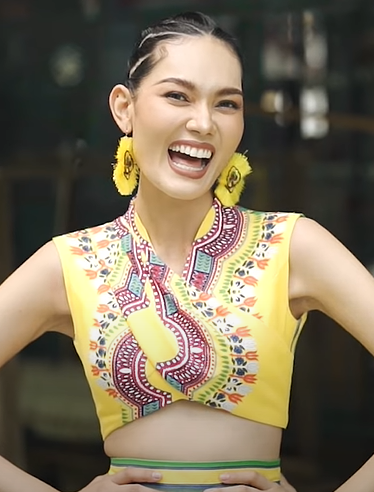
Peerada Yodjai,
Miss Grand Samut Prakan 2020

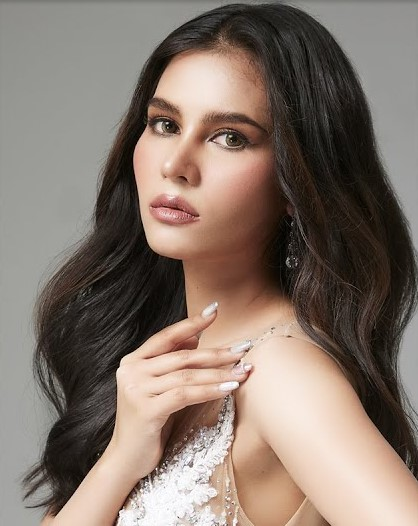
Supaporn Yomrak,
Miss Grand Samut Prakan 2023

== Editions ==
The following table details Miss Grand Samut Prakan's annual editions since 2017.

Edition	Date	Final venue	Entrants	Winner	Ref.
1st	May 5, 2017	Miami Bayside Bangpu, Mueang Samut Prakan	22	Sittinan Richard (Note: Later dethroned, the first runner-up was appointed as the replacement to compete nationally at Miss Grand Thailand 2017.)	
2nd	April 7, 2018	Market Village Suvarnabhumi, Bang Phli, Samut Prakan	40	Pimwalan Buttasuep	
3rd	March 31, 2019	Khung Bang Kachao Market, Phra Pradaeng, Samut Prakan	16	Sudarat Krueakamwang	
4th	July 26, 2020	Robinson Samutprakan, Mueang Samut Prakan	9	Chonthicha Sangkhasa	
5th (Note: Organized as an inter-provincial pageant with the Miss Grand Samut Songkhram and Miss Grand Nakhon Pathom 2021 contests.)	June 29, 2021	Rimkhobfa Urban Resort, Mueang Samut Prakan	20	Peerada Yodjai	
6th	February 18, 2023	Divalux Resort & Spa, Bang Sao Thong, Samut Prakan	13	Supaporn Yomrak	
7th	December 15, 2023	Divalux Resort & Spa, Bang Sao Thong, Samut Prakan	20	Jesita Aramkham	
8th	December 19, 2024	Ratchapruek Hall, Krua Boonlert Restaurant, Mueang Samut Prakan	17	Jirapat Dathumma	
9th (Note: As an interprovincial pageant for Miss Grand Prachuap Khiri Khan and Miss Grand Samut Prakan.)	September 20, 2025	The Kaset Hua Hin Hotel, Hua Hin	15	Sasiyaphat Jirapharkunchai	

== National competition ==
The following is a list of Samut Prakan representatives who competed at the Miss Grand Thailand pageant.

Year	Representative		Original provincial title	Placement at Miss Grand Thailand	Provincial director	Ref.
Year	Romanized name	Thai name	Original provincial title	Placement at Miss Grand Thailand	Provincial director	Ref.
2016	Avika Thammasarot	อวิกา ธรรมสโรช	Appointed	Unplaced	Pitakchai Chitjan and Supharat Thammasarot	
2017	Chatrthira Michas	ฉัตรทิรา มิชาส์	Miss Grand Samut Prakan 2017	Dethroned	Pitakchai Chitjan and Supharat Thammasarot	
2017	Narumon Khamphan	นฤมล คำพันธ์	1st runner-up Miss Grand Samut Prakan 2017	Unplaced	Pitakchai Chitjan and Supharat Thammasarot	
2018	Pimwalan Buttasuep	พิมพ์วลัญช์ บุตตสืบ	Miss Grand Samut Prakan 2018	Unplaced	Pitakchai Chitjan and Supharat Thammasarot	
2019	Sudarat Krueakamwang	สุดารัตน์ เครือคำวัง	Miss Grand Samut Prakan 2019	Unplaced	Pitakchai Chitjan and Supharat Thammasarot	
2020	Chonlathicha Sangkhasa	ชลธิชา สังฆะสา	Miss Grand Samut Prakan 2020	Resigned	Nanyaphat Kotchasan	
2020	Panida Suthinpuek	ปณิดา สุทินเผือก	1st runner-up Miss Grand Samut Prakan 2020	Unplaced	Nanyaphat Kotchasan	
2021	No national pageant due to the COVID-19 pandemic.					
2022	Peerada Yodjai	พีรดา ยอดใจ	Miss Grand Samut Prakan 2021/22	Unplaced	Patiya Nimnoi	
2023	Supaporn Yomrak	สุภาพร ยมรักษ์	Miss Grand Samut Prakan 2023	Unplaced	Patiya Nimnoi	
2024	Jesita Aramkham	เจสิตา อร่ามคำ	Miss Grand Samut Prakan 2024	Unplaced	Patiya Nimnoi	
2025	Jirapat Dathumma	จิราพัชร ดาทุมมา	Miss Grand Samut Prakan 2025	Unplaced	Patiya Nimnoi	
2026	Sasiyaphat Jiraphatkunchai	ศศิยาพัชร์ จิรภัทร์กุลชัย	Miss Grand Samut Prakan 2026		Patiya Nimnoi	
