= Miss Grand Ratchaburi =

Provincial pageant in Ratchaburi, Thailand

Miss Grand ฺRatchaburi มิสแกรนด์ราชบุรี
- Formation: May 6, 2016; 9 years ago
- Founder: Krit Phurithevet
- Type: Beauty pageant
- Headquarters: Ratchaburi
- Location: Thailand
- Official language: Thai
- Provincial Director: Koraphop Tiangmak (2025)
- Affiliations: Miss Grand Thailand

Summary result of Ratchaburi representatives at Miss Grand Thailand
Placement	Number(s)
Winner	0
1st runner-up	1
2nd runner-up	0
3rd runner-up	0
4th runner-up	0
Top 10/11/12	0
Top 20	2
Unplaced	5

Miss Grand Ratchaburi (Thai: มิสแกรนด์ราชบุรี) is a Thai provincial beauty pageant which selects a representative from Ratchaburi province for the Miss Grand Thailand national competition. It was founded in 2016 by an event organizer, Krit Phurithevet (กฤษณ์ ภูริเทเวศร์).

Ratchaburi has yet to win the Miss Grand Thailand title. The highest placement obtained by its representatives is the first runner-up; won in 2016 by Chatchadaporn Kimakorn.

== History ==
In 2016, after Miss Grand Thailand began franchising the provincial competitions to individual organizers, who would name seventy-seven provincial titleholders to compete in the national pageant, the license for Ratchaburi province was obtained by Krit Phurithevet. Under his directorship, the first Miss Grand Ratchaburi contest happened on 6 May 2016 in the city of Ratchaburi, where a model Chatchadaporn Kimakorn was named the winner.

Krit relinquished the franchise to another organizer, Patiya Nimnoi, who served as the licensee from 2019 to 2022. After that, the licensees were changed every year.

The pageant was skipped once; in 2021, due to the COVID-19 pandemic in Thailand, the national organizer was unable to organize the national event, and the country representative for the international tournament was appointed instead.

Winner gallery

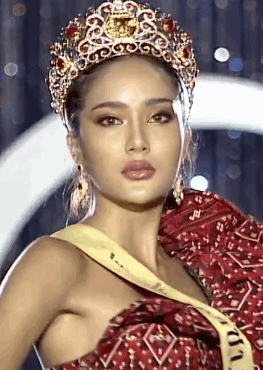
Umawadee Pimpa
Miss Grand Ratchaburi 2022

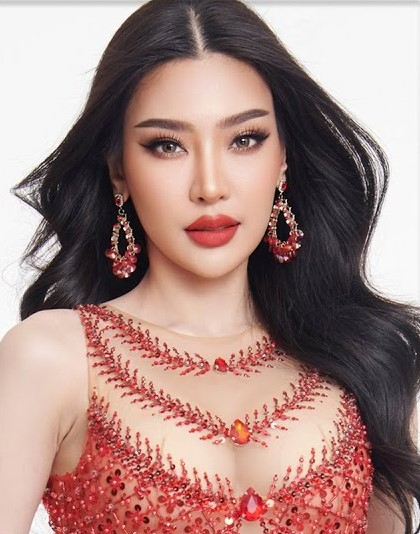
Jutamanee Parasing
Miss Grand Ratchaburi 2023

== Editions ==
The following table details Miss Grand Ratchaburi's annual editions since 2016.

Edition	Date	Final venue	Entrants	Winner	Ref.
1st	May 6, 2016	Riverside Community Hall, Ratchaburi Municipality Office, Mueang Ratchaburi	40	Chatchadaporn Kimakorn	
2nd	May 10, 2017	Photharam Walking Street, Photharam, Ratchaburi	10	Thanchitra Kongkha	
3rd	April 14, 2018	Multipurpose Waterfront Field, Ban Pong, Ratchaburi	10	Natnicha Phongsuwan	
4th (Note: Organized as an inter-provincial pageant with the Miss Grand Nakhon Pathom 2019 contest.)	May 15, 2019	Khum Damnoen Resort, Damnoen Saduak, Ratchaburi	11	Phattharaphon Laipreeda	
5th (Note: Organized as an inter-provincial pageant with the Miss Grand Nakhon Pathom and Miss Grand Samut Songkhram 2020 contests.)	August 11, 2020	Khum Damnoen Resort, Damnoen Saduak, Ratchaburi	21	Kitiya Laaituk	
6th (Note: Organized as an inter-provincial pageant with the Miss Grand Phetchaburi 2022 contest.)	February 22, 2022	Khum Damnoen Resort, Damnoen Saduak, Ratchaburi	10	Umawadi Pimpa	
7th	February 16, 2023	Ratchaburi Gymnasium, Ratchaburi Municipality Office, Mueang Ratchaburi	11	Chuthamani Parasingh	
8th	January 18, 2024	Booze Club, Huai Khwang, Bangkok	10	Worawaran Leelahasuwan	
9th	October 31, 2024	Ratchaburi Gymnasium, Ratchaburi Municipality Office, Mueang Ratchaburi	20	Thanyaphak Patcharaphirom (Note: Later dethroned, the first runner-up, Wikanda Kotkham, was promoted as the replacement.)	
10th (Note: As an inter-provincial pageant for Miss Grand Ratchaburi, Miss Grand Nan,, Miss Grand Ang Thong, Miss Grand Kamphaeng Phet, Miss Grand Kalasin, and Miss Grand Nong Khai.)	October 26, 2025	Rattana Bundit-Universität, Bangkok	16	Sangdawn Buadee	

== National competition ==
The following is a list of Ratchaburi representatives who competed at the Miss Grand Thailand pageant.

Year	Representative		Original provincial title (Note: Title directly obtained from the provincial pageant, not by appointment.)	Placement at Miss Grand Thailand	Provincial director	Ref.
Year	Romanized name	Thai name	Original provincial title	Placement at Miss Grand Thailand	Provincial director	Ref.
2016	Chatchadaporn Kimakorn	ชัชฎาภรณ์ กิมากรณ์	Miss Grand Ratchaburi 2016	1st runner-up	Krit Phurithevet	
2017	Thanchitra Kongkha	ธัญจิตรา คงคา	Miss Grand Ratchaburi 2017	Top 20	Krit Phurithevet	
2018	Natnicha Phongsuwan	ณัฐณิชา ผ่องสุวรรณ	Miss Grand Ratchaburi 2018	Top 20	Krit Phurithevet	
2019	Phattharaphon Laipreeda	ภัทราพร ไล้ปรีดา	Miss Grand Ratchaburi 2019	Unplaced	Patiya Nimnoi	
2020	Kitiya Laaituk	กิติยา ละอายทุกข์	Miss Grand Ratchaburi 2020	Unplaced	Patiya Nimnoi	
2022	Umawadi Pimpa	อุมาวดี ปิมปา	Miss Grand Ratchaburi 2021/22	Unplaced	Patiya Nimnoi	
2023	Chuthamani Parasingh	จุฑามณี พาราสิงห์	Miss Grand Ratchaburi 2023	Unplaced	Ammarin Attayoko	
2024	Worawaran Leelahasuwan	วรวลัญช์ ลีฬหะสุวรรณ	Miss Grand Ratchaburi 2024	Unplaced	Jintacha Bunnag	
2025	Thanyaphak Patcharaphirom	ธัณญภัคส์ พัชรภิย์รมณ์	Miss Grand Ratchaburi 2025	Resigned	Koraphop Thiengmak	
2025	Wikanda Kotkham	วิกานดา โคตรคำ	1st runner-up Miss Grand Ratchaburi 2025	Unplaced	Koraphop Thiengmak	
2026	Sangdawn Buadee	แสงดาว บัวดี	Miss Grand Ratchaburi 2026		Tain Kanyapak	
