= Miss Grand Nong Bua Lamphu =

Provincial pageant in Nong Bua Lamphu, Thailand

Miss Grand Nong Bua Lamphu มิสแกรนด์หนองบัวลำภู
- Formation: April 30, 2016; 10 years ago
- Founder: Amnat Chaiyabut
- Type: Beauty pageant
- Headquarters: Nong Bua Lamphu
- Location: Thailand
- Official language: Thai
- Director: Natthida Phuangkasem (2025)
- Affiliations: Miss Grand Thailand

Summary result of Nong Bua Lamphu representatives at Miss Grand Thailand
Placement	Number(s)
Winner	0
1st runner-up	0
2nd runner-up	0
3rd runner-up	0
4th runner-up	0
Top 10/11/12	1
Top 20/21	0
Unplaced	7

Miss Grand Nong Bua Lamphu (Thai: มิสแกรนด์หนองบัวลำภู) is a Thai provincial beauty pageant which selects a representative from Nong Bua Lamphu province to the Miss Grand Thailand national competition. It was founded in 2016 by local organizer Amnat Chaiyabut (อำนาจ ไชยบุศย์).

Nong Bua Lamphu representatives have yet to win the Miss Grand Thailand title. The highest and only placement they obtained was in the top 10 finalists (5th runner-up), achieved in 2023 by Kotchakorn Kontrakul.

== History ==
In 2016, after Miss Grand Thailand began franchising the provincial competitions to individual organizers, who would name seventy-seven provincial titleholders to compete in the national pageant. The license for Nong Bua Lamphu province was granted to an event organizer Amnat Chaiyabut, who was also the licensee for other 4 Isan contests, including Khon Kaen, Sakon Nakhon, Udon Thani, and Loei. The first Miss Grand Nong Bua Lamphu was co-organized with the four mentioned contests on April 30, 2016, in Mueang Udon Thani, where a university student Wijithra Khankhet was named Miss Grand Nong Bua Lamphu.

The pageant was usually co-organized with other provincial pageants except for the 2017, 2018, and 2024 editions. It was held in Nong Bua Lamphu province only in 2017, 2018, and 2020, while the remaining editions happened in other provinces.

The pageant was skipped once; in 2021, due to the COVID-19 pandemic in Thailand, the national organizer was unable to organize the national event, and the country representative for the international tournament was appointed instead.

Winner gallery

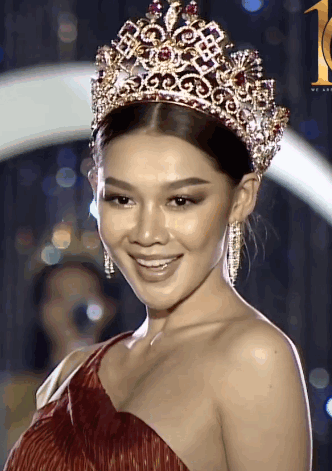
Nuanla-ong Donsuea,
Miss Grand Nong Bua Lamphu 2022

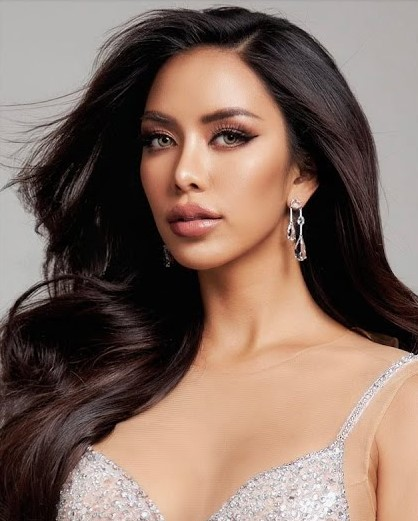
Kodchakorn Kontrakoon,
Miss Grand Nong Bua Lamphu 2023

== Editions ==
The following table details Miss Grand Nong Bua Lamphu's annual editions since 2016.

Edition	Date	Final venue	Entrants	Winner	Ref.
1st (Note: As an inter-provincial pageant for Miss Grand Udon Thani–Khon Kaen–Sakon Nakhon–Nong Bua Lamphu–Loei.)	April 30, 2016	Napalai Hotel, Mueang Udon Thani, Udon Thani	20	Wijithra Khankhet	
2nd	February 12, 2017	Nattapong Grand Hotel, Mueang Nong Bua Lamphu, Nong Bua Lamphu	19	Priewara Chimrakkaew	
3rd	April 27, 2018	Nattapong Grand Hotel, Mueang Nong Bua Lamphu, Nong Bua Lamphu	7	Kotchakorn Khamkhong	
4th (Note: As an inter-provincial pageant for Miss Grand Loei–Phetchabun–Nong Bua Lamphu.)	March 31, 2019	AU Place Hotel, Chiang Khan, Loei	13	Mathuros Romlamduan	
5th (Note: As an inter-provincial pageant for Miss Grand Nong Khai–Nong Bua Lamphu–Bueng Kan.)	August 2, 2020	Sriboonruang Wittayakarn School, Si Bun Rueang, Nong Bua Lamphu	20	Supitcha Nuchprasert	
6th (Note: As an inter-provincial pageant for Miss Grand Loei–Nong Bua Lamphu–Bueng Kan–Sakon Nakhon.)	January 16, 2022	Loei Palace Hotel, Mueang Loei, Loei	18	Nuanlaong Donseu	
7th (Note: As an inter-provincial pageant for Miss Grand Amnat Charoen–Nong Bua Lamphu.)	September 21, 2022	The Mall Lifestore Ngamwongwan, Mueang Nonthaburi, Nonthaburi	11	Kotchakorn Kontrakul	
8th	December 19, 2023	The Circus Studio, Chatuchak, Bangkok	12	Aniphan Chalermburanawong	
9th	October 24, 2024	Spaceplus Bangkok, Royal City Avenue, Bangkok	15	Wanasanan Phengmanee	

== National competition ==
The following is a list of Nong Bua Lamphu representatives who competed at the Miss Grand Thailand pageant.

Year	Representative		Original provincial title	Placement at Miss Grand Thailand	Provincial director	Ref.
Year	Romanized name	Thai name	Original provincial title	Placement at Miss Grand Thailand	Provincial director	Ref.
2016	Wijithra Khankhet	วิจิตรา ขันธ์เขต	Miss Grand Nong Bua Lamphu 2016	Unplaced	Amnat Chaiyabut	
2017	Priewara Chimrakkaew	ปรีย์วรา ฉิมรักแก้ว	Miss Grand Nong Bua Lamphu 2017	Unplaced	Preemart Hemathulin	
2018	Kotchakorn Khamkhong	กชกร คำคง	Miss Grand Nong Bua Lamphu 2018	Unplaced	Yuranan Chantaya	
2019	Mathuros Romlamduan	มธุรส ร่มลำดวนร์	Miss Grand Nong Bua Lamphu 2019	Unplaced	Pitsada Songklod	
2020	Supitcha Nuchprasert	สุพิชชา นุชประเสริฐ	Miss Grand Nong Bua Lamphu 2020	Unplaced	Pitsada Songklod	
2021	No national pageant due to the COVID-19 pandemic.					
2022	Nuanlaong Donseu	นวลละออง ดอนเสือ	Miss Grand Nong Bua Lamphu 2021/22	Unplaced	Thananan Kaewpuang	
2023	Kotchakorn Kontrakoon	กชกร กอนตระกูล	Miss Grand Nong Bua Lamphu 2023	5th runner-up	Piriya Seannok	
2024	Aniphan Chalermburanawong	อนิพรรณ เฉลิมบูรณะวงศ์	Miss Grand Nong Bua Lamphu 2024	Unplaced	Worarakmetha Siriwattanawarakorn	
2025	Wanasanan Phengmanee	วนัสนันท์ เพ็งมณี	Miss Grand Nong Bua Lamphu 2025	Unplaced	Natthida Phuangkasem	
