= Miss Grand Khon Kaen =

Provincial pageant in Khon Kaen, Thailand

Miss Grand Khon Kaen มิสแกรนด์ขอนแก่น
- Formation: April 30, 2016; 9 years ago
- Founder: Amnat Chaiyabut
- Type: Beauty pageant
- Headquarters: Khon Kaen
- Location: Thailand
- Official language: Thai
- Director: Natthaphat Moollao (2021–present)
- Affiliations: Miss Grand Thailand

Summary result of Khon Kaen representatives at Miss Grand Thailand
Placement	Number(s)
Winner	0
1st runner-up	1
2nd runner-up	0
3rd runner-up	0
4th runner-up	0
Top 10/11/12	1
Top 20/21	0
Unplaced	7

Miss Grand Khon Kaen (Thai: มิสแกรนด์ขอนแก่น) is a Thai provincial beauty pageant which selects a representative from Khon Kaen province to the Miss Grand Thailand national competition. It was founded in 2016 by a local organizer Amnat Chaiyabut (อำนาจ ไชยบุศย์).

Khon Kaen representatives have yet to win the Miss Grand Thailand title. The highest and only placement they obtained was the first runner-up, won in 2025 by Chayathanus Saradatta. The other representative was also placed fifth runner-up, obtained by Waranchana Radomlek in 2022.

== History ==
In 2016, after Miss Grand Thailand began franchising the provincial competitions to individual organizers, who would name seventy-seven provincial titleholders to compete in the national pageant. The license for Khon Kaen province was granted to an event organizer Amnat Chaiyabut, who was also the licensee for other 4 Isan contests, including Sakon Nakhon, Nong Bua Lamphu, Udon Thani, and Loei. The first Miss Grand Khon Kaen was co-organized with the four mentioned contests on April 30, 2016, in Mueang Udon Thani, where a third-year university student Siriporn Kasemsuk was named Miss Grand Khon Kaen. It became the stand-alone pageant in 2017.

The pageant was skipped in 2022; due to the COVID-19 pandemic in Thailand, the national organizer was unable to organize the national event in 2021, the 2021 Miss Grand Khon Kean winner was sent to compete in the 2022 national stage instead.

Winner gallery

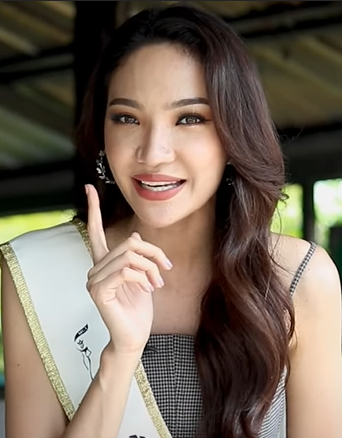
Waranchana Radomlek,
Miss Grand Khon Kaen 2021/22

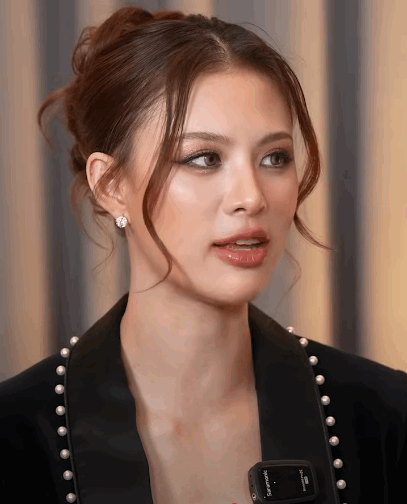
Chayathanus Saradatta,
Miss Grand Khon Kaen 2025

== Editions ==
The following table details Miss Grand Khon Kaen's annual editions since 2016.

Edition	Date	Final venue	Entrants	Winner	Ref.
1st (Note: As an inter-provincial pageant for Miss Grand Udon Thani–Khon Kaen–Loei–Nong Bua Lamphu–Sakon Nakhon.)	April 30, 2016	Napalai Hotel, Mueang Udon Thani, Udon Thani	20	Siriporn Kasemsuk	
2nd	May 30, 2017	CentralPlaza Khon Kaen, Mueang Khon Kaen, Khon Kaen	11	Warisa Srinukul	
3rd	May 31, 2018	CentralPlaza Khon Kaen, Mueang Khon Kaen, Khon Kaen	13	Patchara Woha	
4th	May 25, 2019	Khonkaen International Convention & Exhibition Centre, Mueang Khon Kaen	21	Sirinart Sum-im	
5th	July 25, 2020	Khon Kaen Hotel, Mueang Khon Kaen, Khon Kaen	5	Sasipapha pahonthitanaphum	
6th	June 27, 2021	Pullman Khon Kaen Raja Orchid Hotel, Mueang Khon Kaen, Khon Kaen	26	Woranchana Radomlek	
7th	October 9, 2022	CentralPlaza Khon Kaen, Mueang Khon Kaen, Khon Kaen	17	Kwanticha Thorat	
8th	November 5, 2023	Khonkaen International Convention & Exhibition Centre, Mueang Khon Kaen	15	Natthinee Thanatpornpinyo (Note: Later resigned, and the 1st runner-up, Kanokphon Muennoi, was appointed as the replacement.)	
9th (Note: As an inter-provincial pageant for Miss Grand Khon Kaen and Miss Grand Phatthalung.)	November 24, 2024	CentralPlaza Khon Kaen, Mueang Khon Kaen, Khon Kaen	20	Chayathanus Saradatta	

== National competition ==
The following is a list of Khon Kaen representatives who competed at the Miss Grand Thailand pageant.

Year	Representative		Original provincial title	Placement at Miss Grand Thailand	Provincial director	Ref.
Year	Romanized name	Thai name	Original provincial title	Placement at Miss Grand Thailand	Provincial director	Ref.
2016	Siriporn Kasemsuk	ศิริพร เกษมสุข	Miss Grand Khon Kaen 2016	Unplaced	Amnat Chaiyabut	
2017	Warisa Srinukul	วาริศา ศรีนุกูล	Miss Grand Khon Kaen 2017	Unplaced	Preemart Hemathulin	
2018	Patchara Woha	พัชรา วอหา	Miss Grand Khon Kaen 2018	Unplaced	Preemart Hemathulin	
2019	Sirinart Sum-im	สิรินาถ สุ่มอิ่ม	Miss Grand Khon Kaen 2019	Unplaced	Preemart Hemathulin	
2020	Sasipapha pahonthitanaphum	ศศิปภา ปภณธีร์ธนาภูมิ	Miss Grand Khon Kaen 2020	Unplaced	Thanat Harintachinda	
2021	No national pageant due to the COVID-19 pandemic.					
2022	Woranchana Radomlek	วรัญชนา ระดมเล็ก	Miss Grand Khon Kaen 2021/22	5th runner-up	Natthaphat Moollao	
2023	Kwanticha Thorat	ขวัญทิชา โถรัตน์	Miss Grand Khon Kaen 2023	Unplaced	Natthaphat Moollao	
2024	Natthinee Thanatpornphinyo	ณัฏฐ์ฑินี ธนัตพรภิญโญ	Miss Grand Khon Kaen 2024	Resigned	Natthaphat Moollao	
2024	Kanokphon Muennoi	กนกพร หมื่นน้อย	1st runner-up Miss Grand Khon Kaen 2024	Unplaced	Natthaphat Moollao	
2025	Chayathanus Saradatta	ชญาธนุส ศรทัตต์	Miss Grand Khon Kaen 2025	1st runner-up	Natthaphat Moollao	
