= Miss Grand Loei =

Provincial pageant in Loei, Thailand

Miss Grand ฺLoei มิสแกรนด์เลย
- Formation: April 30, 2016; 10 years ago
- Founder: Amnat Chaiyabut
- Type: Beauty pageant
- Headquarters: Loei
- Location: Thailand
- Official language: Thai
- Director: Kannika Suthi (2025)
- Affiliations: Miss Grand Thailand

Summary result of Loei representatives at Miss Grand Thailand
Placement	Number(s)
Winner	0
1st runner-up	0
2nd runner-up	0
3rd runner-up	1
4th runner-up	0
Top 10/11/12	1
Top 20/21	0
Unplaced	6

Miss Grand Loei (Thai: มิสแกรนด์เลย) is a Thai provincial beauty pageant which selects a representative from Loei province to the Miss Grand Thailand national competition. It was founded in 2016 by a local organizer Amnat Chaiyabut (อำนาจ ไชยบุศย์).

Loei representatives have yet to win the Miss Grand Thailand title. The highest placement they obtained was the third runner-up, won in 2023 by Atcharee Srisuk.

== History ==
In 2016, after Miss Grand Thailand began franchising the provincial competitions to individual organizers, who would name seventy-seven provincial titleholders to compete in the national pageant. The license for Loei province was granted to an event organizer Amnat Chaiyabut, who was also the licensee for other 4 Isan contests, including Khon Kaen, Sakon Nakhon, Udon Thani, and Nong Bua Lamphu. The first Miss Grand Loei was co-organized with the four mentioned contests on April 30, 2016, in Mueang Udon Thani, where Pimyada Phosasim was named Miss Grand Loei.

The pageant was usually co-organized with other provincial pageants. It was a stand-alone pageant only in 2018, 2020, 2023, and 2024. It was skipped in 2021, due to the COVID-19 pandemic in Thailand, the national organizer was unable to organize the national event, and the country representative for the international tournament was appointed instead.

Winner gallery

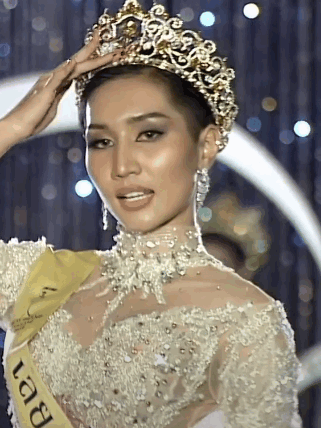
Chanakan Nasom,
Miss Grand Loei 2022

== Editions ==
The following table details Miss Grand Loei's annual editions since 2016.

Edition	Date	Final venue	Entrants	Winner	Ref.
1st (Note: As an inter-provincial pageant for Miss Grand Udon Thani–Khon Kaen–Sakon Nakhon–Nong Bua Lamphu–Loei.)	April 30, 2016	Napalai Hotel, Mueang Udon Thani, Udon Thani	20	Pimyada Phosasim	
2nd (Note: As an inter-provincial pageant for Miss Grand Udon Thani–Loei.)	May 7, 2017	Boonthavorn Shopping Center, Mueang Udon Thani, Udon Thani	16	Wanatchaporn Inphet	
3rd	March 31, 2018	Chiangkhan River Mountain Resort, Chiang Khan, Loei	12	Yuphalak Lakul	
4th (Note: As an inter-provincial pageant for Miss Grand Loei–Phetchabun–Nong Bua Lamphu.)	March 31, 2019	AU Place Hotel, Chiang Khan, Loei	13	Jilaporn Phumipat	
5th	February 2, 2020	Loei Provincial Hall's Front Field, Mueang Loei, Loei	12	Natnicha Rumching	
6th (Note: As an inter-provincial pageant for Miss Grand Loei–Nong Bua Lamphu–Bueng Kan–Sakon Nakhon.)	January 16, 2022	Loei Palace Hotel, Mueang Loei, Loei	18	Chanakan Nasom	
7th	February 25, 2023	Colosseum Show Pattaya, Pattaya, Chonburi	19	Atcharee Srisuk	
8th	January 19, 2024	Asgard Nightclub, Huai Khwang, Bangkok	15	Phattharapon Sonthipak	
9th	January 13, 2025	Chang Chui Creative Park, Bang Phlat, Bangkok	9	Arthitaya Jaithiang	

== National competition ==
The following is a list of Loei representatives who competed at the Miss Grand Thailand pageant.

Year	Representative		Original provincial title	Placement at Miss Grand Thailand	Provincial director	Ref.
Year	Romanized name	Thai name	Original provincial title	Placement at Miss Grand Thailand	Provincial director	Ref.
2016	Pimyada Phosasim	พิมพ์ญาดา โพธิ์สาสิม	Miss Grand Loei 2016	Unplaced	Amnat Chaiyabut	
2017	Wanatchaporn Inphet	วนัชพร อินทร์เพ็ชร์	Miss Grand Loei 2017	Unplaced	Preemart Hemathulin	
2018	Yuphalak Lakul	ยุพลักษณ์ ลากุล	Miss Grand Loei 2018	Unplaced	Jindarat Thawiltemthap	
2019	Jilaporn Phumipat	จิฬาภรณ์ ภูมิพัฒน์	Miss Grand Loei 2019	Top 10	Pitsada Songklod	
2020	Natnicha Rumching	ณัฐณิชา รุมชิง	Miss Grand Loei 2020	Unplaced	Pitsada Songklod	
2021	No national pageant due to the COVID-19 pandemic.					
2022	Chanakan Nasom	ชนากานต์ นาโสม	Miss Grand Loei 2021/22	Unplaced	Thananan Kaewpuang	
2023	Atcharee Srisuk	อัจฉรีย์ ศรีสุข	Miss Grand Loei 2023	3rd runner-up	Warintorn Wattasang	
2024	Phattharapon Sonthipak	ภัทรภร สนธิภักดิ์	Miss Grand Loei 2024	Unplaced	Thanat Bunsemsen	
2025	Arthitaya Jaithiang	อะทิตยา ใจเที่ยง	Miss Grand Loei 2025	Unplaced	Kannika Suthi	
