= Miss Grand Nong Khai =

Provincial pageant in Nong Khai, Thailand

Miss Grand Nong Khai มิสแกรนด์หนองคาย
- Formation: May 7, 2016; 10 years ago
- Founder: Natthaphong Khemsiri
- Type: Beauty pageant
- Headquarters: Nong Khai
- Location: Thailand
- Official language: Thai
- Director: Phutthachai Unthachai (2025)
- Affiliations: Miss Grand Thailand

Summary result of Nong Khai representatives at Miss Grand Thailand
Placement	Number(s)
Winner	0
1st runner-up	0
2nd runner-up	0
3rd runner-up	0
4th runner-up	0
Top 10/11/12	0
Top 20/21	2
Unplaced	6

Miss Grand Nong Khai (Thai: มิสแกรนด์หนองคาย) is a Thai provincial beauty pageant which selects a representative from Nong Khai province to the Miss Grand Thailand national competition. It was founded in 2016 by a local organizer Natthaphong Khemsiri (ณัฐพงษ์ เข็มศิริ).

Nong Khai representatives have yet to win the Miss Grand Thailand title. The highest placement they obtained was in the top 20 finalists, achieved in 2016 and 2019 by Saranya Phinyophonphanit and Natnicha Bunyuen, respectively.

== History ==
In 2016, after Miss Grand Thailand began franchising the provincial competitions to individual organizers, who would name seventy-seven provincial titleholders to compete in the national pageant. The license for Nong Khai province was granted to an event organizer Natthaphong Khemsiri, who organized the first Miss Grand Nong Khai pageant in Mueang Nong Khai on May 7, 2016, and named a 27-year-old flight attendant from Bangkok Saranya Phinyophonphanit the winner. Khemsiri relinquished the license to Warakorn Jiansermsin (วรากร เจียรเสริมสิน) in 2018.

The pageant was sometimes co-organized with other provincial pageants: in 2017 and 2019 with Miss Grand Bueng Kan, and in 2020 with Miss Grand Nong Bua Lamphu–Miss Grand Bueng Kan.

The pageant was skipped once; in 2021, due to the COVID-19 pandemic in Thailand, the national organizer was unable to organize the national event, and the country representative for the international tournament was appointed instead.

Winner gallery

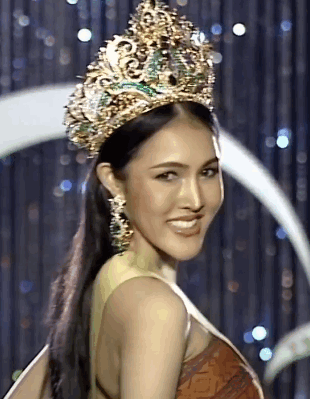
Panida Hemtadathanakun,
Miss Grand Nong Khai 2022

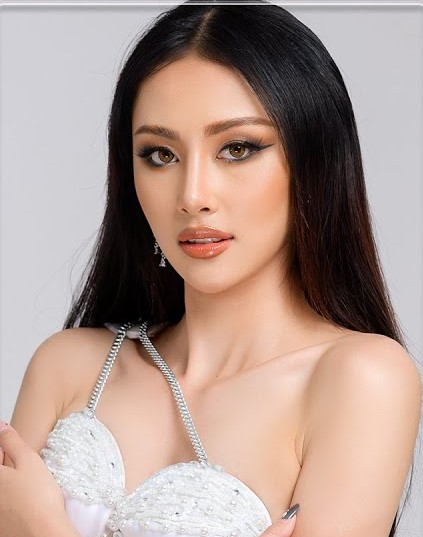
Butsaba Phiosahwang,
Miss Grand Nong Khai 2023

== Editions ==
The following table details Miss Grand Nong Khai's annual editions since 2016.

Edition	Date	Final venue	Entrants	Winner	Ref.
1st	May 7, 2016	Vviang Lifestyle Mall, Mueang Nong Khai, Nong Khai	12	Saranya Phinyophonphanit	
2nd (Note: As an inter-provincial pageant for Miss Grand Nong Khai–Bueng Kan.)	May 13, 2017	Nongkhai Tavilla & Convention Center, Mueang Nong Khai, Nong Khai	15	Natthanankarn Rijinda	
3rd	May 13, 2018	Nongkhai Tavilla & Convention Center, Mueang Nong Khai, Nong Khai	15	Pinthira Phuttaraksa	
4th	May 25, 2019	Royal Nakhara Hotel and Convention Centre, Mueang Nong Khai, Nong Khai	9	Natnicha Bunyuen	
5th (Note: As an inter-provincial pageant for Miss Grand Nong Khai–Nong Bua Lamphu–Bueng Kan.)	August 2, 2020	Sriboonruang Wittayakarn School, Si Bun Rueang, Nong Bua Lamphu	20	Kesorn Nanthatong	
6th	December 31, 2021	Naga Field, Mueang Nong Khai, Nong Khai	14	Panida Hemthadathanakul	
7th	February 14, 2023	Cultural Square, Lamduan Temple, Mueang Nong Khai, Nong Khai	12	Busaba Phiwsawang	
8th	December 30, 2023	Cultural Square, Lamduan Temple, Mueang Nong Khai, Nong Khai	9	Pichapa Jinnathikakun	
9th	December 18, 2024	Park & Pool Hotel Restaurant, Mueang Nong Khai, Nong Khai	8	Chanyathida Matiyapak	
10th (Note: As an inter-provincial pageant for Miss Grand Ratchaburi, Miss Grand Nan,, Miss Grand Ang Thong, Miss Grand Kamphaeng Phet, Miss Grand Kalasin, and Miss Grand Nong Khai.)	October 26, 2025	Rattana Bundit University, Bangkok	16	Wannaporn Makphong	

== National competition ==
The following is a list of Nong Khai representatives who competed at the Miss Grand Thailand pageant.

Year	Representative		Original provincial title	Placement at Miss Grand Thailand	Provincial director	Ref.
Year	Romanized name	Thai name	Original provincial title	Placement at Miss Grand Thailand	Provincial director	Ref.
2016	Saranya Phinyophonphanit	ศรัญญา ภิญโญพรพาณิชย์	Miss Grand Nong Khai 2016	Top 20	Natthaphong Khemsiri	
2017	Natthanankarn Rijinda	นัธนันท์กานต์ หรี่จินดา	Miss Grand Nong Khai 2017	Unplaced	Natthaphong Khemsiri	
2018	Pinthira Phuttaraksa	ปิณฑิรา พุทธรักษา	Miss Grand Nong Khai 2018	Unplaced	Warakorn Jiansermsin	
2019	Natnicha Bunyuen	ณัฐณิชา บุญยืน	Miss Grand Nong Khai 2019	Top 20	Unknown	
2020	Kesorn Nanthatong	เกษร นันทะทอง	Miss Grand Nong Khai 2020	Unplaced	Pitsada Songklod	
2021	No national pageant due to the COVID-19 pandemic.					
2022	Panida Hemthadathanakul	พนิดา เหมธาดาธนกุล	Miss Grand Nong Khai 2021/22	Unplaced	Guntorn Duangkaew	
2023	Busaba Phiwsawang	บุษบา ผิวสว่าง	Miss Grand Nong Khai 2023	Unplaced	Guntorn Duangkaew	
2024	Pichapa Jinnathikakun	พิชาภา จิณณะฑิกากุล	Miss Grand Nong Khai 2024	Unplaced	Guntorn Duangkaew	
2025	Chanyathida Matiyapak	ชัญญธิดา มะติยาภักดิ์	Miss Grand Nong Khai 2025	Unplaced	Phutthachai Unthachai	
2026	Wannaporn Makphong	วรรณพร มากพงศ์	Miss Grand Nong Khai 2025		Tain Kanyapak	
