= Miss Grand Samut Songkhram =

Provincial pageant in Samut Songkhram, Thailand

Miss Grand Samut Songkhram มิสแกรนด์สมุทรสงคราม
- Formation: March 26, 2017; 9 years ago
- Founder: Nopphawat Aphiphatdechakul
- Type: Beauty pageant
- Headquarters: Samut Songkhram
- Location: Thailand
- Official language: Thai
- Provincial Director: Thanawat Im-amphai (2025)
- Affiliations: Miss Grand Thailand

Miss Grand Samut Songkhram (Thai: มิสแกรนด์สมุทรสงคราม) is a Thai provincial beauty pageant which selects a representative from Samut Songkhram province to the Miss Grand Thailand national competition. It was founded in 2017 by an event organizer, Nopphawat Aphiphatdechakul (นพวรรธน์ อภิภัสร์เดชากุล).

Samut Songkhram representatives have yet to secure a spot in the Miss Grand Thailand national contest.

== History ==
In 2016, after Miss Grand Thailand began franchising the provincial competitions to individual organizers, who would name seventy-seven provincial titleholders to compete in the national pageant, the license for Samut Songkhram province was obtained by Nopphawat Aphiphatdechakul. Under his directorship, the first Miss Grand Ratchaburi contest took place the following year on 26 March in the Amphawa, and a model Chuleeporn Kerdwan was named the winner.

In 2019, Nopphawat relinquished the franchise to another organizer, Patiya Nimnoi, who served as the licensee until 2022. After that, the licensees were changed every year.

Winner gallery

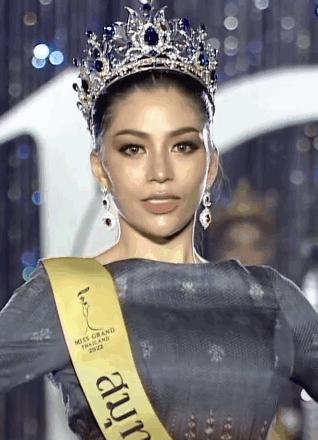
Rita Battaglino,
Miss Grand Samut Songkhram 2022

== Editions ==
The following table details Miss Grand Samut Songkhram's annual editions since 2017.

Edition	Date	Final venue	Entrants	Winner	Ref.
1st	March 26, 2017	Chuchaiburi Sri Amphawa, Amphawa, Samut Songkhram	12	Chuleeporn Kerdwan	
2nd	May 6, 2018	Chuchaiburi Sri Amphawa, Amphawa, Samut Songkhram	9	Nichakul Senawong	
3rd	May 31, 2019	Riverton Amphawa Hotel, Mueang, Samut Songkhram	15	Kanyawee Nookaew	
4th (Note: Organized as an inter-provincial pageant with the Miss Grand Nakhon Pathom and Miss Grand Ratchaburi 2020 contests.)	August 11, 2020	Khum Damnoen Resort, Damnoen Saduak, Ratchaburi	21	Parichat Buahem	
5th (Note: Organized as an inter-provincial pageant with the Miss Grand Samut Prakan and Miss Grand Nakhon Pathom 2021 contests.)	June 29, 2021	Rimkhobfa Urban Resort, Mueang Samut Prakan	20	Rita Battaglino	
6th	February 27, 2023	Mahachai, Mueang, Samut Songkhram	6	Kanitta Saeyap	
7th	November 15, 2023	Amphawa Nanon Hotel, Amphawa, Samut Songkhram	13	Wikanda Khotkham	
8th (Note: As an inter-provincial pageant for Miss Grand Amnat Charoen and Miss Grand Samut Songkhram.)	December 11, 2024	Khlong Maduea Subdistrict Assembly Hall, Krathum Baen, Samut Sakhon	13	Panicha Pratipwisarut	

== National competition ==
The following is a list of Samut Songkhram representatives who competed at the Miss Grand Thailand pageant.

Year	Representative		Original provincial title	Placement at Miss Grand Thailand	Provincial director	Ref.
Year	Romanized name	Thai name	Original provincial title	Placement at Miss Grand Thailand	Provincial director	Ref.
2016	Thanika Ubon	ฐานิกา อุบล	Appointed	Unplaced	Nopphawat Aphiphatdechakul	
2017	Chuleeporn Kerdwan	ชุลีภรณ์ เกิดวั่น	Miss Grand Samut Songkhram 2017	Unplaced	Nopphawat Aphiphatdechakul	
2018	Nichakul Senawong	ณิชกุล เสนาวงษ์	Miss Grand Samut Songkhram 2018	Unplaced	Nopphawat Aphiphatdechakul	
2019	Kanyawee Nookaew	กัญญาวีร์ หนูแก้ว	Miss Grand Samut Songkhram 2019	Unplaced	Patiya Nimnoi	
2020	Parichat Buahem	ปาริชาติ บัวเหม	Miss Grand Samut Songkhram 2020	Unplaced	Patiya Nimnoi	
2022	Rita Battaglino	ริต้า ปัตตาลญีโน	Miss Grand Samut Songkhram 2021/22	Unplaced	Patiya Nimnoi	
2023	Kanitta Saeyap	ขนิษฐา แซ่ยับ	Miss Grand Samut Songkhram 2023	Unplaced	Unknown	
2024	Wikanda Khotkham	วิกานดา โคตรคำ	Miss Grand Samut Songkhram 2024	Unplaced	Kittipong Chusang	
2025	Panicha Pratipwisarut	ปณิชา ประทีปวิศรุต	Miss Grand Samut Songkhram 2025	Unplaced	Thanawat Im-amphai	
