= Miss Grand Nakhon Pathom =

Provincial pageant in Nakhon Pathom, Thailand

Miss Grand ฺNakhon Pathom มิสแกรนด์นครปฐม
- Formation: March 18, 2017; 9 years ago
- Founder: Nattaphakin Noipitak
- Type: Beauty pageant
- Headquarters: Nakhon Pathom
- Location: Thailand
- Official language: Thai
- Provincial Directors: Srisuriya Sariminyupharet
- Affiliations: Miss Grand Thailand

Summary result of Nakhon Pathom representatives at Miss Grand Thailand
Placement	Number(s)
Winner	0
1st runner-up	1
2nd runner-up	0
3rd runner-up	0
4th runner-up	0
Top 10/11/12	0
Top 20	1
Unplaced	7

Miss Grand Nakhon Pathom (Thai: มิสแกรนด์นครปฐม) is a Thai provincial beauty pageant which selects a representative from Nakhon Pathom province for the Miss Grand Thailand national competition. It was founded in 2017 by an event organizer, Nattaphakin Noipitak (ณัฏฐภาคิน น้อยพิทักษ์).

Nakhon Pathom has yet to win the Miss Grand Thailand title. The highest placement obtained by its representatives is the first runner-up; won in 2018 by Jiratchaya Sukh-intha.

== History ==
In 2016, after Miss Grand Thailand began franchising the provincial competitions to individual organizers, who would name seventy-seven provincial titleholders to compete in the national pageant, the representative of Nakhon Pathom province was appointed. The first contest of Miss Grand Nakhon Pathom was organized the following year after the license was granted to a local organizer, Nattaphakin Noipitak (ณัฏฐภาคิน น้อยพิทักษ์). The event happened on March 18, 2017, in Mueang Nakhon Pathom, wherein a geology student from Mahidol University, Natthaphat Phongpraphan, was named that year's winner.

The pageant was skipped once; in 2021, due to the COVID-19 pandemic in Thailand, the national organizer was unable to organize the national event, and the country representative for the international tournament was appointed instead.

Winner gallery

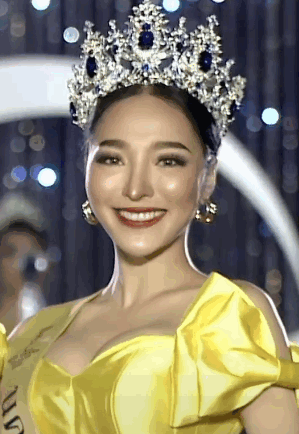
Parithaniya Sarinsiyaporn,
Miss Grand Nakhon Pathom 2022

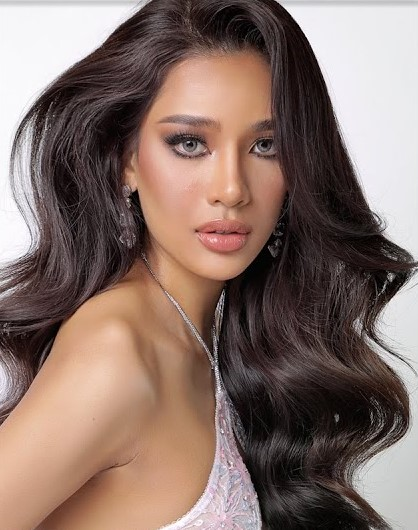
Wichayanard Narad,
Miss Grand Nakhon Pathom 2023

== Editions ==
The following table details Miss Grand Nakhon Pathom's annual editions since 2017.

Edition	Date	Final venue	Entrants	Winner	Ref.
1st	March 18, 2017	Pin Kleaw Hall, Nakhon Pathom Rajabhat University	20	Natthaphat Phongpraphan	
3rd	April 29, 2018	Siam Plaza, Mueang, Nakhon Pathom	14	Jiratchaya Sukh-intha	
4th (Note: Organized as an inter-provincial pageant with the Miss Grand Ratchaburi 2019 contest.)	May 15, 2019	Khum Damnoen Resort, Damnoen Saduak, Ratchaburi	11	Nanmanat Kraiha	
5th (Note: Organized as an inter-provincial pageant with the Miss Grand Ratchaburi and Miss Grand Samut Songkhram 2019 contests.)	August 11, 2020	Khum Damnoen Resort, Damnoen Saduak, Ratchaburi	21	Anyaphat Pitiprajakwat	
6th (Note: Organized as an inter-provincial pageant with the Miss Grand Samut Prakan and Miss Grand Samut Songkhram 2021 contests.)	June 29, 2021	Rimkhobfa Urban Resort, Mueang Samut Prakan	20	Parithaniya Sarinsiyaporn	
7th	November 10, 2022	Central Chaengwattana, Pak Kret, Nonthaburi	20	Wichayanard Narat	
8th	November 23, 2023	Central Chaengwattana, Pak Kret, Nonthaburi	21	Suwapitcha Sombut	
9th (Note: Organized as an inter-provincial pageant with the Miss Grand Nan 2025 contest.)	August 28, 2024	Central Chaengwattana, Pak Kret, Nonthaburi	20	Wijittra Aneak	

== National competition ==
The following is a list of Nakhon Pathom representatives who competed at the Miss Grand Thailand pageant.

Year	Representative		Original provincial title	Placement at Miss Grand Thailand	Provincial director	Ref.
Year	Romanized name	Thai name	Original provincial title	Placement at Miss Grand Thailand	Provincial director	Ref.
2016	Chakriya Dechmak	ชาคริยา เดชมาก	Appointed	Unplaced	Nattaphakin Noipitak	
2017	Natthaphat Phongpraphan	ณัฐพัชร พงษ์ประพันธ์	Miss Grand Nakhon Pathom 2017	Unplaced	Nattaphakin Noipitak	
2018	Jiratchaya Sukh-intha	จิรัชยา สุขอินต๊ะ	Miss Grand Nakhon Pathom 2018	1sr runner-up	Nattaphakin Noipitak	
2019	Nanmanat Kraiha	นันท์มนัส ไกรหา	Miss Grand Nakhon Pathom 2019	Unplaced	Patiya Nimnoi	
2020	Anyaphat Pitiprajakwat	อัญพัชร์ ปิติประจักษ์วัชร	Miss Grand Nakhon Pathom 2020	Unplaced	Patiya Nimnoi	
2022	Parithaniya Sarinsiyaporn	พริธนิญา สริณศิญาพร	Miss Grand Nakhon Pathom 2021/22	Unplaced	Patiya Nimnoi	
2023	Wichayanard Narat	วิชญณาถ นาราษฎร์	Miss Grand Nakhon Pathom 2023	Top 20	Srisuriya Sariminyupharet	
2024	Suwapitcha Sombut	สุวพิชชา สมบัติ	Miss Grand Nakhon Pathom 2024	Unplaced	Srisuriya Sariminyupharet	
2025	Wijittra Aneak	วิจิตรา เอนก	Miss Grand Nakhon Pathom 2025	Unplaced	Srisuriya Sariminyupharet	
