= Miss Grand Ranong =

Provincial pageant in Ranong, Thailand

Miss Grand ฺRanong มิสแกรนด์ระนอง
- Formation: May 13, 2017; 9 years ago
- Founder: Nanmanat Wuttipattarapakorn
- Type: Beauty pageant
- Headquarters: Ranong
- Location: Thailand
- Members: Miss Grand Thailand
- Official language: Thai
- Provincial Director: Phachisa Penpakdee

Summary result of Ranong representatives at Miss Grand Thailand
Placement	Number(s)
Winner	1
1st runner-up	0
2nd runner-up	0
3rd runner-up	0
4th runner-up	0
Top 10/11/12	0
Top 20	1

Miss Grand Ranong (Thai: มิสแกรนด์ระนอง) is a Thai provincial beauty pageant which selects a representative from Ranong province for the Miss Grand Thailand national competition, founded in 2017, by a Ranong-based entrepreneur, Nanmanat Wuttipattarapakorn (นันท์มนัส วุฒิภัทรปกรณ์).

Since the first competition in the Miss Grand Thailand pageant in 2016, Ranong's representatives won the main title once; in 2020 by Patcharaporn Chanthapradit, while the other representative was also placed Top 20 once; in 2024 by Natthawikarn Pheukamornkul.

== History ==
In 2016, after Miss Grand Thailand began franchising the provincial competitions to individual organizers, who would name seventy-seven provincial titleholders to compete in the national pageant, the license for Ranong province was purchased by a local entrepreneur, Sa-nga Kangwan (สง่า กังวาล), but the first representative was appointed. Later in 2017, Ninyakanon lost the franchise to another local organizer Nanmanat Wuttipattarapakorn (นันท์มนัส วุฒิภัทรปกรณ์), who organized the first Miss Grand Ranong competition on 13 May 2017, in which a Saint John's University's student, Lalita Hongsamat, was named the winner.

The pageant was skipped once; in 2021, due to the COVID-19 pandemic in Thailand, the national organizer was unable to organize the national event, and the country representative for the international tournament was appointed instead.

Winner gallery

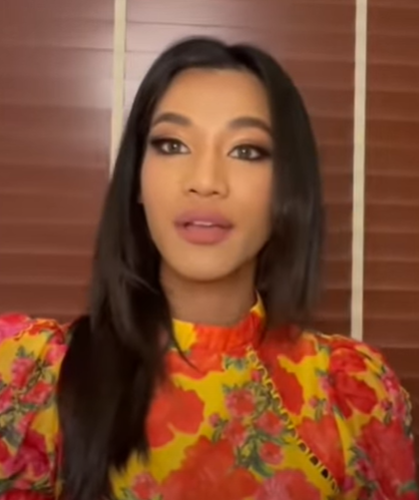
Patcharaporn Chanthapradit
Miss Grand Ranong 2020

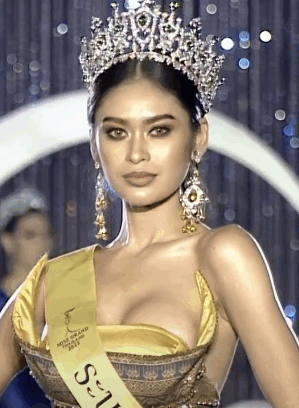
Ratchaneekorn Prasertpornsak
Miss Grand Ranong 2022

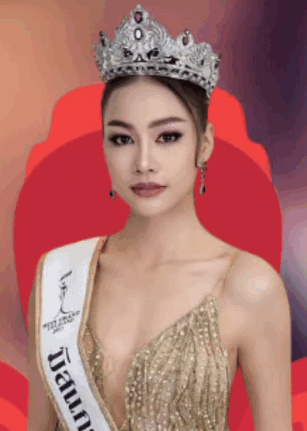
Yanisa Suthinun
Miss Grand Ranong 2023

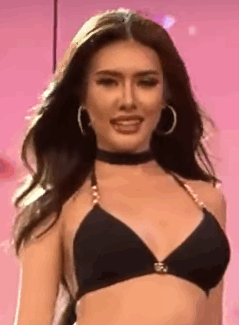
Natthawikarn Pheuk-amornkun
Miss Grand Ranong 2024

== Editions ==
The following table details Miss Grand Ranong's annual editions since 2016.

Edition	Date	Final venue	Entrants	Winner	Ref.
1st	13 May 2017	Tinidee Hotel, Ranong	10	Lalita Hongsamat	
2nd	12 May 2018	Tinidee Hotel, Ranong	11	Purewipha Phayonlert	
3rd (Note: Held in parallel with the Miss Grand Chumphon 2019 pageant.)	19 May 2019	Tinidee Hotel, Ranong	8	Natthida Phuengnum	
4th (Note: Held in parallel with the Miss Grand Surat Thani 2020 pageant.)	9 August 2020	Nipa Garden Hotel, Surat Thani	15	Patcharaporn Chanthapradit	
5th (Note: Held in parallel with the Miss Grand Krabi 2022 pageant.)	20 February 2022	Jansom Beach Resort, Ranong	7	Ratchaneekorn Prasertphonsak	
6th	26 February 2023	Bunjongburi Hotel, Surat Thani	10	Yanisa Suthinun	
7th	4 December 2023	Heritage Grand Convention Ranong, Ranong	11	Pailin Wongsa	
8th (Note: As an inter-provincial pageant for Miss Grand Sisaket–Ranong.)	1 November 2024	Hotel Prompiman, Mueang, Sisaket	10	Kittiyaphon Buason	

== National competition ==
The following is a list of Ranong representatives who competed at the Miss Grand Thailand pageant.

Year	Representative		Original provincial title	Placement at Miss Grand Thailand	Provincial director	Ref.
Year	Romanized name	Thai name	Original provincial title	Placement at Miss Grand Thailand	Provincial director	Ref.
2016	Kathalin Whungkaew	คัทลิน หวังแก้ว	Appointed	Withdrew	Sa-nga Kangwan	
2017	Lalita Hongsamat	ลลิตา หงษ์สะมัต	Miss Grand Ranong 2017	Unplaced	Nanmanat Wuttipattarapakorn	
2018	Purewipha Phayonlert	เพียววิภา พยนเลิศ	Miss Grand Ranong 2018	Resigned	Somsak Sukanin	
2018	Nalin Nalinthip	นลิน นลินทิพย์	1st runner-up Miss Grand Ranong 2018	Unplaced	Somsak Sukanin	
2019	Natthida Phuengnum	ณัฐธิดา พึ่งนุ่ม	Miss Grand Ranong 2019	Unplaced	Chalong Konglikit	
2020	Patcharaporn Chanthapradit	พัชรพร จันทรประดิษฐ์	Miss Grand Ranong 2020	Winner	Natchajin Wuttipattarapakorn	
2022	Ratchaneekorn Prasertphonsak	รัชนีกร ประเสริฐพรศักดิ์	Miss Grand Ranong 2022	Unplaced	Ekkalak Buapoon; Akkanan Etokung	
2023	Yanisa Suthinun	ญาณิศา สุทธินุ่น	Miss Grand Ranong 2023	Unplaced	Akkanan Etokung	
2024	Pailin Wongsa	ไพลิน วงษา	Miss Grand Ranong 2024	Resigned	Nitipong Kaewmanee	
2024	Natthawikarn Pheukamornkul	ณัฐวิกาญจน์ พฤกษ์อมรกุล	1st runner-up Miss Grand Ranong 2024	Top 20	Nitipong Kaewmanee	
2025	Kittiyaphon Buason	กิตติยาภรณ์ บัวสอน	Miss Grand Ranong 2025	Unplaced	Awirut Akkabut	
