= Miss Grand Phetchaburi =

Provincial pageant in Phetchaburi, Thailand

Miss Grand ฺPhetchaburi มิสแกรนด์เพชรบุรี
- Formation: May 8, 2017; 8 years ago
- Founder: Chanyapatch Asawapornwiput
- Type: Beauty pageant
- Headquarters: Phetchaburi
- Location: Thailand
- Official language: Thai
- Provincial Directors: Anchanlee Aorachan; Dharmaros Saengsami; Chotika Klanbut (2025)
- Affiliations: Miss Grand Thailand

Summary result of Phetchaburi representatives at Miss Grand Thailand
| Placement | Number(s) |
|---|---|
| Winner | 0 |
| 1st runner-up | 0 |
| 2nd runner-up | 0 |
| 3rd runner-up | 0 |
| 4th runner-up | 1 |
| Top 10/11/12 | 0 |
| Top 20 | 0 |
| Unplaced | 7 |

Miss Grand Phetchaburi (Thai: มิสแกรนด์เพชรบุรี) is a Thai provincial beauty pageant which selects a representative from Phetchaburi province to the Miss Grand Thailand national competition. It was founded in 2017 by Chanyapatch Asawapornwiput.

Phetchaburi representatives have yet to win the Miss Grand Thailand title. The highest and only one placement obtained by its representatives was the fourth runner-up, won in 2016 by Anchana Archklom, who later competed internationally in the Top Model of the World pageant and was ranked fifth.

== History ==
In 2016, after Miss Grand Thailand began franchising the provincial competitions to individual organizers, who would name seventy-seven provincial titleholders to compete in the national pageant, the license for Phetchaburi province was obtained by an entrepreneur Maiaek Chaiphet, who appointed a model Anchana Archklom to compete at the 2016 national contest and was the fourth runner-up. The first Miss Grand Phetchaburi contest took place the following year after the license was transferred to another organizer, Chanyapatch Asawapornwiput.

Since the beginning of franchise distribution, Miss Grand Phetchaburi franchise holders have changed almost every year.

The pageant was skipped once; in 2021, due to the COVID-19 pandemic in Thailand, the national organizer was unable to organize the national event, and the country representative for the international tournament was appointed instead.

Winner gallery

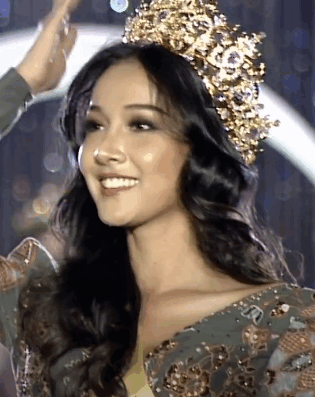
Wasunan Sawekwiharee,
Miss Grand Phetchaburi 2022

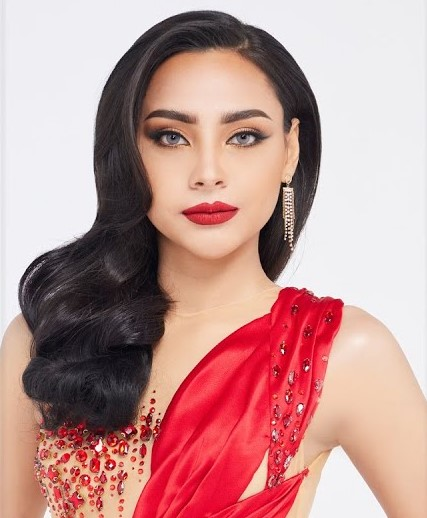
Wanda Carry Dahmann,
Miss Grand Phetchaburi 2023

== Editions ==
The following table details Miss Grand Phetchaburi's annual editions since 2017.

| Edition | Date | Final venue | Entrants | Winner | Ref. |
|---|---|---|---|---|---|
| 1st | May 8, 2017 | Suanpech Riverview Resort, Tha Yang, Phetchaburi | 7 | Chonlakan Puangnoi | |
| 2nd | April 22, 2018 | Robinson Lifestyle Phetchaburi, Ban Lat, Phetchaburi | 7 | Meennicha Lao-arun | |
| 3rd | May 18, 2019 | Long Beach Cha-am Hotel, Cha-am, Phetchaburi | 12 | Thiptanya Meesiri | |
| 4th | August 12, 2020 | Puektian Villa Hotel, Tha Yang, Phetchaburi | 7 | Natthinon Ahingsaro | |
| 5th (Note: Organized as an inter-provincial pageant with the Miss Grand Ratchaburi 2022 contest.) | February 22, 2022 | Khum Damnoen Resort, Damnoen Saduak, Ratchaburi | 10 | Wasunant Sawekwiharee | |
| 6th | February 26, 2023 | Chalermprakiat Cultural Hall, Phetchaburi Rajabhat University, Mueang | 8 | Wanda Carrie Dahlmann | |
| 7th | January 14, 2024 | Phanom Kaewkamnerd Auditorium, Phetchaburi Rajabhat University, Mueang | 8 | Peeranya Puangsombat | |
| 8th | November 16, 2024 | KK Riverside Resort, Kaeng Krachan, Phetchaburi | 24 | Pancharat Chaiyanboon | |

== National competition ==
The following is a list of Phetchaburi representatives who competed at the Miss Grand Thailand pageant.

| Year | Representative | | Original provincial title | Placement at Miss Grand Thailand | Provincial director | Ref. |
| Year | Romanized name | Thai name | Original provincial title | Placement at Miss Grand Thailand | Provincial director | Ref. |
|---|---|---|---|---|---|---|
| 2016 | Anchana Archklom | อัญชนา อาจกล่อม | Appointed | 4th runner-up | Maiaek Chaiphet | |
| 2017 | Chonlakan Puangnoi | ชลกาญจน์ พวงน้อย | Miss Grand Phetchaburi 2017 | Unplaced | Chanyapatch Asawapornwiput | |
| 2018 | Meennicha Lao-arun | มีนณิชา เล้าอรุณ | Miss Grand Phetchaburi 2018 | Unplaced | Thanachalit Sudsuthin | |
| 2019 | Thiptanya Meesiri | ทิพย์ธัญญา มีศิริ | Miss Grand Phetchaburi 2019 | Unplaced | Kittithat Singhwong | |
| 2020 | Natthinon Ahingsaro | ณัฐฐินนท์ อหิงสะโร | Miss Grand Phetchaburi 2020 | Unplaced | Kornnapat Yuengyong | |
| 2021 | No national pageant due to the COVID-19 pandemic. | | | | | |
| 2022 | Wasunant Sawekwiharee | วสุนันท์ เสวกวิหารี | Miss Grand Phetchaburi 2021/22 | Unplaced | Patiya Nimnoi | |
| 2023 | Wanda Carrie Dahlmann | วันดา แคร์รี่ ดาห์มันน์ | Miss Grand Phetchaburi 2023 | Unplaced | Theeraphong Khadphad | |
| 2024 | Peeranya Puangsombat | พีรญา พวงสมบัติ | Miss Grand Phetchaburi 2024 | Unplaced | Theeraphong Khadphad | |
| 2025 | Pancharat Chaiyanboon | ปัญจรัตน์ ไชยยันต์บูรณ์ | Miss Grand Phetchaburi 2025 | Unplaced | Anchanlee Aorachan, and others | |
