= Miss Grand Sisaket =

Provincial pageant in Sisaket, Thailand

Miss Grand ฺSisaket มิสแกรนด์ศรีสะเกษ
- Formation: May 15, 2016; 9 years ago
- Founder: Amnat Senkhram
- Type: Beauty pageant
- Headquarters: Sisaket
- Location: Thailand
- Official language: Thai
- Director: Awirut Akkabut (2017–2020, 2025–present)
- Affiliations: Miss Grand Thailand

Summary result of Sisaket representatives at Miss Grand Thailand
Placement	Number(s)
Winner	0
1st runner-up	0
2nd runner-up	0
3rd runner-up	0
4th runner-up	1
Top 10/11/12	0
Top 20/21	2
Unplaced	5

Miss Grand Sisaket (Thai: มิสแกรนด์ศรีสะเกษ) is a Thai provincial beauty pageant which selects a representative from Sisaket province to the Miss Grand Thailand national competition. It was founded in 2016 by an entrepreneur, Amnat Senkhram (อำนาจ เส้นคราม).

Sisaket representatives have yet to win the Miss Grand Thailand title. The highest placement they obtained was the fourth runner-up, won in 2017 by Kamonrat Thanon.

== History ==
In 2016, after Miss Grand Thailand began franchising the provincial competitions to individual organizers, who would name seventy-seven provincial titleholders to compete in the national pageant. The license for Sisaket province was granted to a local entrepreneur, Amnat Senkhram, who organized the first Miss Grand Sisaket contest in that year on 15 May and named a model from Khon Kaen, Chachurat Moonpim, the winner. Senkhram relinquished the franchised to a producer Awirut Akkabut the following year.

The pageant was sometimes co-organized with other Miss Grand Thailand's provincial stages; in 2020 with Miss Grand Ubon Ratchathani and 2025 with Miss Grand Ranong. Due to the cancelation of the 2021 national event, the 2021 Miss Grand Ubon Sisaket winner was sent to compete in the 2022 national pageant instead, resulting in the skip of the 2022 provincial pageant.

Winner gallery

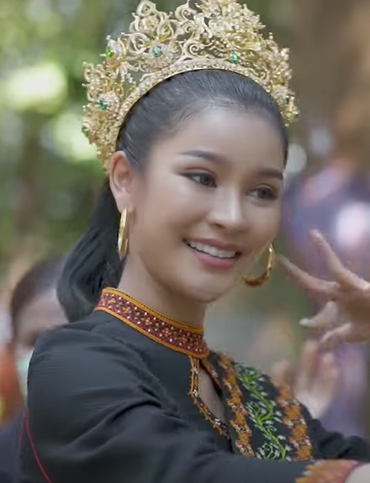
Kittiyaporn Lanont,
Miss Grand Sisaket 2021/22

== Editions ==
The following table details Miss Grand Sisaket's annual editions since 2016.

Edition	Date	Final venue	Entrants	Winner	Ref.
1st	15 May 2016	Chalermprakiat Auditorium, Mueang, Sisaket	26	Chachurat Moonpim	
2nd	6 May 2017	Dipangkorn Rasmijoti Auditorium, Sisaket Rajabhat University, Mueang	13	Kamonrat Thanon	
3rd	26 May 2018	Chalermprakiat Auditorium, Mueang, Sisaket	7	Athitiya Benjapak	
4th	26 May 2019	MVP Teater, Mueang, Sisaket	10	Sireethon Sajan	
5th (Note: As an inter-provincial pageant for Miss Grand Ubon Ratchathani–Sisaket.)	20 July 2020	Sipruetthalai Hotel, Mueang, Sisaket	15	Chanthima Saiyot	
6th	26 July 2021	Due to the COVID-19 pandemic, the pageant was held virtually.	7	Krittiyaporn Lanon	
7th	21 January 2023	Wisommai Physical Education Building, Mueang, Sisaket	11	Kunlanat Hongsrimuang	
8th	24 December 2023	Sripruttheswara Theatre, Mueang, Sisaket	11	Kritsadaporn Nakrai	
9th (Note: As an inter-provincial pageant for Miss Grand Ranong–Sisaket.)	1 November 2024	Hotel Prompiman, Mueang, Sisaket	10	Pitchapa Justice	

== National competition ==
The following is a list of Sisaket representatives who competed at the Miss Grand Thailand pageant.

Year	Representative		Original provincial title	Placement at Miss Grand Thailand	Provincial director	Ref.
Year	Romanized name	Thai name	Original provincial title	Placement at Miss Grand Thailand	Provincial director	Ref.
2016	Chachurat Moonpim	ชชุรัตน์ มูลพิมพ์	Miss Grand Sisaket 2016	Top 20	Amnat Senkhram	
2017	Kamonrat Thanon	กมลรัตน์ ทานนท์	Miss Grand Sisaket 2017	4th runner-up	Awirut Akkabut	
2018	Athitiya Benjapak	อาทิติยา เบ็ญจะปัก	Miss Grand Sisaket 2018	Unplaced	Awirut Akkabut	
2019	Sireethon Sajan	สิรีธร สาจันทร์	Miss Grand Sisaket 2019	Unplaced	Awirut Akkabut	
2020	Chanthima Saiyot	จันทร์ทิมา สายยศ	Miss Grand Sisaket 2020	Unplaced	Awirut Akkabut	
2021	No national pageant due to the COVID-19 pandemic.					
2022	Kittiyaporn Lanon	กฤติยาภรณ์ ลานนท์	Miss Grand Sisaket 2021/22	Top 20	Chonphumin Duanyai	
2023	Kunlanat Hongsrimuang	กุลณัฐ หงษ์ศรีเมือง	Miss Grand Sisaket 2023	Unplaced	Chonphumin Duanyai	
2024	Kritsadaporn Nakrai	กฤษฎาภรณ์ นาใคร	Miss Grand Sisaket 2024	Unplaced	Chonphumin Duanyai	
2025	Pitchapa Justice	พิชชาภา จัสติส	Miss Grand Sisaket 2025	Top 20	Awirut Akkabut	
