= Miss Grand Udon Thani =

Provincial pageant in Udon Thani, Thailand

Miss Grand ฺUdon Thani มิสแกรนด์อุดรธานี
- Formation: April 30, 2016; 10 years ago
- Founder: Amnat Chaiyabut
- Type: Beauty pageant
- Headquarters: Udon Thani
- Location: Thailand
- Official language: Thai
- Director: Yuranan Chantaya (2018, 2020–present)
- Affiliations: Miss Grand Thailand

Summary result of Udon Thani representatives at Miss Grand Thailand
Placement	Number(s)
Winner	0
1st runner-up	0
2nd runner-up	0
3rd runner-up	0
4th runner-up	0
Top 10/11/12	0
Top 20/21	4
Unplaced	5

Miss Grand Udon Thani (Thai: มิสแกรนด์อุดรธานี) is a Thai provincial beauty pageant which selects a representative from Udon Thani province to the Miss Grand Thailand national competition. It was founded in 2016 by a local organizer Amnat Chaiyabut (อำนาจ ไชยบุศย์).

Udon Thani representatives have yet to win the Miss Grand Thailand title. The highest placement they obtained was in the top 20 finalists, achieved in 2016, 2018, 2020, and 2025.

== History ==
In 2016, after Miss Grand Thailand began franchising the provincial competitions to individual organizers, who would name seventy-seven provincial titleholders to compete in the national pageant. The license for Udon Thani province was granted to an event organizer Amnat Chaiyabut, who was also the licensee for other 4 Isan contests, including Khon Kaen, Sakon Nakhon, Nong Bua Lamphu, and Loei. The first Miss Grand Udon Thani was co-organized with the four mentioned contests on April 30, 2016, in Mueang Udon Thani, where a model Jiraporn Thiansri was named Miss Grand Udon Thani.

In addition to the 2016 edition, the pageant was co-organized with other provincial stages a few times; with Miss Grand Loei in 2017, Miss Grand Amnat Charoen–Yasothon in 2018, and Miss Grand Sakon Nakhon in 2020.

The pageant was skipped in 2022; due to the COVID-19 pandemic in Thailand, the national organizer was unable to organize the national event in 2021, the 2021 Miss Grand Udon Thani winner was sent to compete in the 2022 national stage instead.

Winner gallery

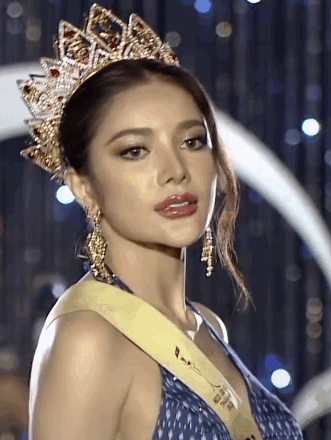
Sara Helena Sarakan,
Miss Grand Udon Thani 2022

== Editions ==
The following table details Miss Grand Udon Thani's annual editions since 2016.

Edition	Date	Final venue	Entrants	Winner	Ref.
1st (Note: As an inter-provincial pageant for Miss Grand Udon Thani–Khon Kaen–Sakon Nakhon–Nong Bua Lamphu–Loei.)	April 30, 2016	Napalai Hotel, Mueang Udon Thani, Udon Thani	20	Jiraporn Thiansri	
2nd (Note: As an inter-provincial pageant for Miss Grand Udon Thani–Loei.)	May 7, 2017	Boonthavorn Shopping Center, Mueang Udon Thani, Udon Thani	16	Ployphannarai Chuenchom	
3rd (Note: As an inter-provincial pageant for Miss Grand Udon Thani–Amnat Charoen–Yasothon.)	May 26, 2018	Boonthavorn Shopping Center, Mueang Udon Thani, Udon Thani	17	Wiranat Kowintasut	
4th	May 30, 2019	Thyme Garden Space, Mueang Udon Thani, Udon Thani	20	Kamonwan Lao-in	
5th (Note: As an inter-provincial pageant for Miss Grand Udon Thani–Sakon Nakhon.)	July 20, 2020	Montatip Hall, Mueang Udon Thani, Udon Thani	19	Suphannika Chamroenchai	
6th	July 11, 2021	Montatip Hall, Mueang Udon Thani, Udon Thani	18	Herena Sarakarn	
7th	November 18, 2022	Montatip Hall, Mueang Udon Thani, Udon Thani	20	Patcharida Ngongking	
8th	January 25, 2024	Montatip Hall, Mueang Udon Thani, Udon Thani	13	Athityakon Boon-un (Note: Withdrew during the 2024 national pageant camp due to health problems, and the first runner-up, Namruethai Sodsri, was elected as the replacement to compete nationally.)	
9th	December 28, 2024	Montatip Hall, Mueang Udon Thani, Udon Thani	18	Natthamanee Pitchayasuttisil	

== National competition ==
The following is a list of Udon Thani representatives who competed at the Miss Grand Thailand pageant.

Year	Representative		Original provincial title	Placement at Miss Grand Thailand	Provincial director	Ref.
Year	Romanized name	Thai name	Original provincial title	Placement at Miss Grand Thailand	Provincial director	Ref.
2016	Jiraporn Thiansri	จิราพร เทียนศรี	Miss Grand Udon Thani 2016	Top 20	Amnat Chaiyabut	
2017	Ployphannarai Chuenchom	พลอยพรรณราย ชื่นชม	Miss Grand Udon Thani 2017	Unplaced	Preemart Hemathulin	
2018	Wiranat Kowintasut	วีราณัฐ โควินทะสุด	Miss Grand Udon Thani 2018	Top 20	Yuranun Juntaya	
2019	Kamonwan Lao-in	กมลวรรณ เหลาอินทร์	Miss Grand Udon Thani 2019	Unplaced	Natthanan Thanathiaranun	
2020	Suphannika Chamroenchai	สุพรรณิการ์ จำเริญชัย	Miss Grand Udon Thani 2020	Top 20	Yuranun Juntaya	
2021	No national pageant due to the COVID-19 pandemic.					
2022	Herena Sarakarn	เฮเรน่า สารกาล	Miss Grand Udon Thani 2021/22	Unplaced	Yuranun Juntaya	
2023	Patcharida Ngongking	พัชริดา งอนกิ่ง	Miss Grand Udon Thani 2023	Unplaced	Yuranun Juntaya	
2024	Athitayakorn Bun-oon	อทิตยากร บุญอุ่น	Miss Grand Udon Thani 2024	Withdrew	Yuranun Juntaya	
2024	Namruethai Sodsri	น้ำฤทัย สอดศรี	1st runner-up Miss Grand Udon Thani 2024	Unplaced	Yuranun Juntaya	
2025	Natthamanee Pitchayasuttisil	ณัฏฐามณี พิชญสุทธิศีล	Miss Grand Udon Thani 2025	Top 20	Yuranun Juntaya	
2026	Jessica Cristina Niinimaa	เจสสิก้า คริสตินา นีนนิมาร์	Miss Grand Udon Thani 2025	5th Runners-Up		
