= Miss Grand Surat Thani =

Provincial pageant in Surat Thani, Thailand

Miss Grand ฺSurat Thani มิสแกรนด์สุราษฎร์ธานี
- Formation: May 14, 2016; 10 years ago
- Founder: Teeraphat Phungsiri
- Type: Beauty pageant
- Headquarters: Surat Thani
- Location: Thailand
- Members: Miss Grand Thailand
- Official language: Thai
- Provincial Directors: Wichai Promma; Tassanai Kotthong (2025)

Summary result of Surat Thani representatives at Miss Grand Thailand
Placement	Number(s)
Winner	0
1st runner-up	0
2nd runner-up	0
3rd runner-up	0
4th runner-up	0
Top 10/11/12	2
Top 20	0
Unplaced	6

Miss Grand Surat Thani (Thai: มิสแกรนด์สุราษฎร์ธานี) is a Thai provincial beauty pageant which selects a representative from Surat Thani province for the Miss Grand Thailand national competition, founded in 2016 by a local talent manager, Teeraphat Phungsiri.

Surat Thani's representatives have never won the main title since the first competition in the Miss Grand Thailand pageant in 2016. Its representatives were placed among the semi-finalists (Top 10/12) twice; in 2018 and 2019.

== History ==
In 2016, after Miss Grand Thailand began franchising the provincial competitions to individual organizers, who would name seventy-seven provincial titleholders to compete in the national pageant, the license for Surat Thani province was purchased by a local entrepreneur, Teeraphat Phungsiri, who organized the first contest of Miss Grand Surat Thani on 14 May 2016, in which a former Miss Grand Thailand 2014 and 2015 finalist, Natthakorn Kaew-Anan, was elected the winner.

The pageant was skipped once; in 2021, due to the COVID-19 pandemic in Thailand, the national organizer was unable to organize the national event, and the country representative for the international tournament was appointed instead.

Winner gallery

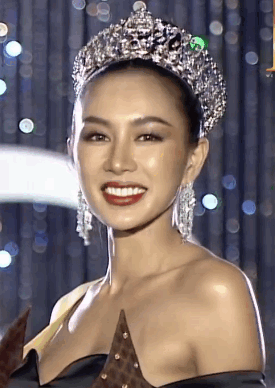
Sulax Siriphattharaphong
Miss Grand Surat Thani 2022

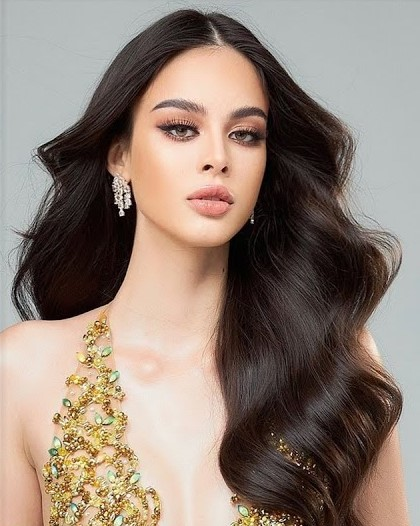
Angelina Skye Walker
Miss Grand Surat Thani 2023

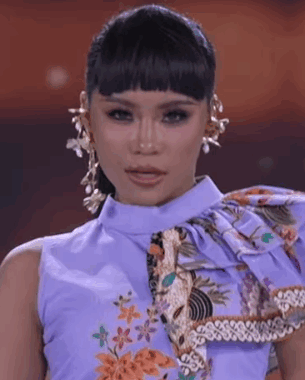
Pawarisa Choosuk
Miss Grand Surat Thani 2025

== Editions ==
The following table details Miss Grand Surat Thani's annual editions since 2016.

Edition	Date	Final venue	Entrants	Winner	Ref.
1st	14 May 2016	CBD2 Hotel, Surat Thani	16	Natthakorn Kaew-Anan	
2nd	21 May 2017	CentralPlaza Surat Thani, Surat Thani	15	Phattharakan Plermjai	
3rd	22 Apr 2018	CentralPlaza Surat Thani, Surat Thani	14	Sakawrat Khruithong	
4th	16 Feb 2019	Nipa Garden Hotel, Surat Thani	14	Kasama Suetrong	
5th (Note: Held in parallel with the Miss Grand Ranong 2020 pageant.)	9 Aug 2020	Nipa Garden Hotel, Surat Thani	15	Similan Hemthanont	
6th	20 Mar 2021	Nipa Garden Hotel, Surat Thani	10	Sulax Siriphattharaphong	
7th	25 Feb 2023	Nipa Garden Hotel, Surat Thani	10	Angelina Skye Walker	
8th	14 Jan 2024	Nipa Garden Hotel, Surat Thani	8	Sue Hyeon Yoon	
9th (Note: Organized as an inter-provincial pageant with the Miss Grand Nonthaburi contest.)	21 Dec 2024	Central Samui, Samui, Surat Thani	14	Pawarisa Choosuk	

== National competition ==
The following is a list of Surat Thani representatives who competed at the Miss Grand Thailand pageant.

Year	Representative		Original provincial title	Placement at Miss Grand Thailand	Provincial director	Ref.
Year	Romanized name	Thai name	Original provincial title	Placement at Miss Grand Thailand	Provincial director	Ref.
2016	Natthakorn Kaew-Anan	ณัฏฐากร แก้วอนันต์	Miss Grand Surat Thani 2016	Unplaced	Teeraphat Phungsiri	
2017	Phattharakan Plermjai	ภัทรกันย์ ปลื้มใจ	Miss Grand Surat Thani 2017	Unplaced	Teeraphat Phungsiri	
2018	Sakawrat Khruithong	สกาวรัตน์ ครุยทอง	Miss Grand Surat Thani 2018	Top 12	Kotchamon Wuttipattarapakorn	
2019	Kasama Suetrong	กษมา ซื่อตรง	Miss Grand Surat Thani 2019	Top 10	Kotchamon Wuttipattarapakorn	
2020	Similan Hemthanont	สิมิลัน เหมทานนท์	Miss Grand Surat Thani 2020	Unplaced	Kotchamon Wuttipattarapakorn	
2022	Sulax Siriphattharaphong	สุลักษมิ์ ศิริภัทรพงศ์	Miss Grand Surat Thani 2022	Unplaced	Kotchamon Wuttipattarapakorn	
2023	Angelina Skye Walker	แองเจลิน่า วอร์คเกอร์	Miss Grand Surat Thani 2023	Unplaced	Kotchamon Wuttipattarapakorn	
2024	Sue Hyeon Yoon	ซูฮยอน ยุน	Miss Grand Surat Thani 2024	Unplaced	Kotchamon Wuttipattarapakorn	
2025	Pawarisa Choosuk	ปวริศา ชูสุข	Miss Grand Surat Thani 2025	Top 20	Wichai Phromma	
