= Miss Grand Prachuap Khiri Khan =

Provincial pageant in Prachuap Khiri Khan, Thailand

Miss Grand Prachuap Khiri Khan มิสแกรนด์ประจวบคีรีขันธ์
- Formation: March 5, 2017; 9 years ago
- Founder: Kanisa Natthapaphan
- Type: Beauty pageant
- Headquarters: Prachuap Khiri Khan
- Location: Thailand
- Official language: Thai
- Provincial Directors: Patiya Nimnoi (2023–present)
- Affiliations: Miss Grand Thailand

Summary result of Prachuap Khiri Khan representatives at Miss Grand Thailand
Placement	Number(s)
Winner	0
1st runner-up	0
2nd runner-up	1
3rd runner-up	0
4th runner-up	0
Top 10/11/12	0
Top 20	1
Unplaced	6

Miss Grand Prachuap Khiri Khan (Thai: มิสแกรนด์ประจวบคีรีขันธ์) is a Thai provincial beauty pageant which selects a representative from Prachuap Khiri Khan province to the Miss Grand Thailand national competition. It was founded in 2017 by Kanisa Natthapaphan (กณิษา ณัฎฐปภาณ).

Prachuap Khiri Khan representatives have yet to win the Miss Grand Thailand title. The highest placement they obtained was the second runner-up, won in 2017 by Sarucha Nilchan.

== History ==
In 2016, after Miss Grand Thailand began franchising the provincial competitions to individual organizers, who would name seventy-seven provincial titleholders to compete in the national pageant, the license for Prachuap Khiri Khan province was obtained by an entrepreneur Kanisa Natthapaphan, who served as the pageant director until 2022. Under her directorship, the first Miss Grand Prachuap Khiri Khan contest was organized in March 2017 in Hua Hin, and a model Sarucha Nilchan was announced the winner. Natthapaphan relinquished the franchise to Patiya Nimnoi in 2023.

In 2024, two district-level pageants, Miss Grand Sam Roi Yot 2024 and Miss Grand Pran Buri 2024, were organized to elect candidates for that year's provincial contest.

The pageant was skipped once; in 2021, due to the COVID-19 pandemic in Thailand, the national organizer was unable to organize the national event, and the country representative for the international tournament was appointed instead.

Winner gallery

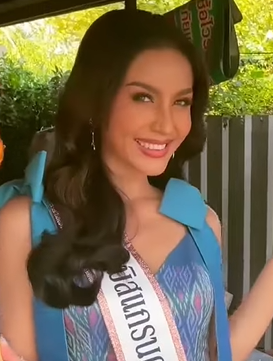
Kansuda Chanakeeree,
Miss Grand Prachuap Khiri Khan 2022

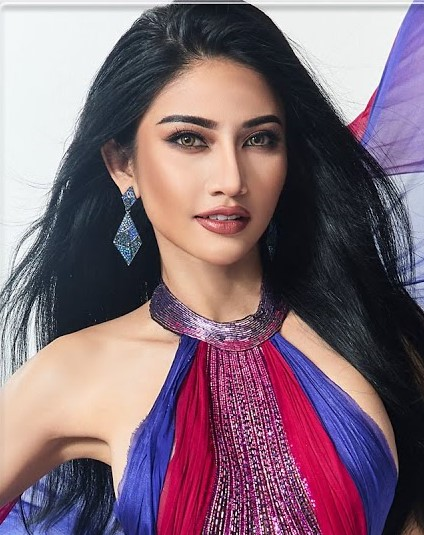
Chanidapa Boon-iem,
Miss Grand Prachuap Khiri Khan 2023

== Editions ==
The following table details Miss Grand Prachuap Khiri Khan's annual editions since 2017.

Edition	Date	Final venue	Entrants	Winner	Ref.
1st	March 5, 2017	Blúport Huahin, Hua Hin, Prachuap Khiri Khan	19	Sarucha Nilchan	
2nd	March 28, 2018	Blúport Huahin, Hua Hin, Prachuap Khiri Khan	14	Meuangphet Duansak	
3rd	May 10, 2019	Blúport Huahin, Hua Hin, Prachuap Khiri Khan	15	Manirath Pichairat	
4th	July 3, 2020	Hua Hin Golf Villa Boutique Hotel, Hua Hin, Prachuap Khiri Khan	13	Kanyarat Theppiban	
5th	February 24, 2022	Holiday Inn Vana Nava Hua Hin, Hua Hin, Prachuap Khiri Khan	13	Kansuda Chanakeeree	
6th	February 27, 2023	Blúport Huahin, Hua Hin, Prachuap Khiri Khan	12	Chanidapa Boon-iem	
7th	January 21, 2024	Blúport Huahin, Hua Hin, Prachuap Khiri Khan	12	Plaifha Thongdonpum	
8th	November 30, 2024	Blúport Huahin, Hua Hin, Prachuap Khiri Khan	15	Suthida Tjärnås	
9th (Note: As an interprovincial pageant for Miss Grand Prachuap Khiri Khan and Miss Grand Samut Prakan)	September 20, 2025	The Kaset Hua Hin Hotel, Hua Hin	15	Suphannee Noinonthong (Note: Later dethroned.)	

== National competition ==
The following is a list of Prachuap Khiri Khan representatives who competed at the Miss Grand Thailand pageant.

Year	Representative		Original provincial title	Placement at Miss Grand Thailand	Provincial director	Ref.
Year	Romanized name	Thai name	Original provincial title	Placement at Miss Grand Thailand	Provincial director	Ref.
2016	Kanephon Intamoon	คเณพร อินต๊ะมูล	Appointed	Unplaced	Kanisa Natthapaphan	
2017	Sarucha Nilchan	ศรุชา นิลจันทร์	Miss Grand Prachuap Khiri Khan 2017	2nd runner-up	Kanisa Natthapaphan	
2018	Meuangphet Duansak	เมืองเพชร เดือนศักดิ์	Miss Grand Prachuap Khiri Khan 2018	Unplaced	Kanisa Natthapaphan	
2019	Manirath Pichairat	มณีรัตน์ พิชัยรัตน์	Miss Grand Prachuap Khiri Khan 2019	Unplaced	Kanisa Natthapaphan	
2020	Kanyarat Theppiban	กัญญารัตน์ เทพภิบาล	Miss Grand Prachuap Khiri Khan 2020	Unplaced	Kanisa Natthapaphan	
2021	No national pageant due to the COVID-19 pandemic.					
2022	Kansuda Chanakeeree	กัลย์สุดา ชนาคีรี	Miss Grand Prachuap Khiri Khan 2021/22	Top 20	Kanisa Natthapaphan	
2023	Chanidapa Boon-iem	ชนิดาภา บุญเอี่ยม	Miss Grand Prachuap Khiri Khan 2023	Unplaced	Patiya Nimnoi	
2024	Plaifha Thongdonpum	ปลายฟ้า ทองดอนพุ่ม	Miss Grand Prachuap Khiri Khan 2024	Unplaced	Patiya Nimnoi	
2025	Suthida Tjärnås	สุธิดา ยาร์โนส	Miss Grand Prachuap Khiri Khan 2025	Unplaced	Patiya Nimnoi	
2026	TBA (Note: As the replacement for the original winner, Suphannee Noinonthong (สุพรรณี น้อยโนนทอง), who was dethroned.)				Patiya Nimnoi	
