= Mae Yanang =

Mae Yanang แม่ย่านาง (ພະ)ແມ່ຍ່ານາງ ព្រះម៉ែជំនាងទូក
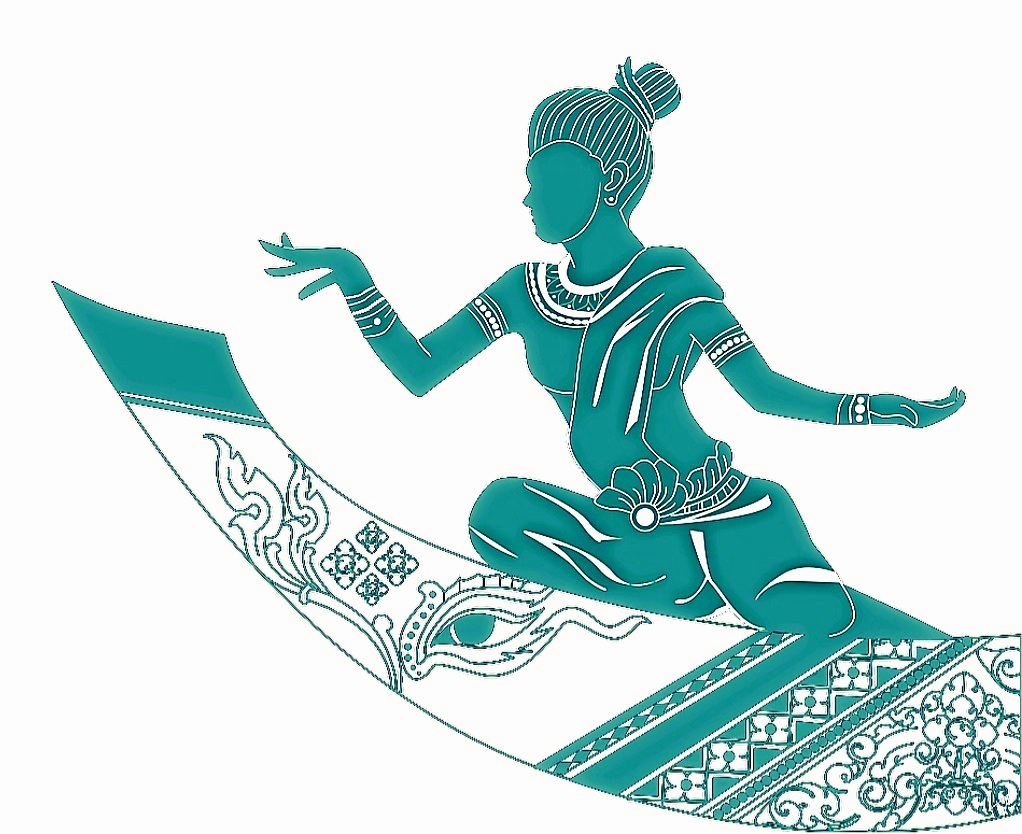
- Mae Yanang

Origin
- Country: Thailand, Cambodia, Laos
- Region: Southeast Asia

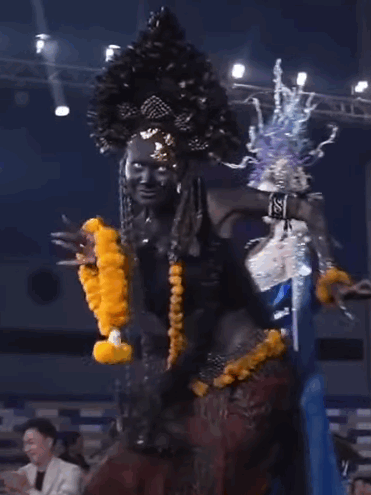
Mae Yanang costume in the Thai beauty pageant's costume competition

Mae Yanang (Thai: แม่ย่านาง; Lao: (ພະ)ແມ່ຍ່ານາງ; Khmer: ព្រះម៉ែជំនាងទូក) are water spirits guarding boats and various vehicles in Thai, Cambodian, and Laotian cultures. They wear traditional clothes of each respective culture. The tradition of worshipping Mae Yanang comes from the worshipping of female deities such as Mae Phosop and Nang Kwak, which may be derived from the worship of Mazu in Chinese folk religion.

== Origins ==
In the past, large logs were used for processing boats and various vehicles, mostly from Takhian wood, which is difficult to decay. And in this special tree, according to the spirit religion and spiritualism, there is a horde of angels. When it was dug into a boat, Nang Takhian had to be invited to protect the boat and the ship's owner by standing at the boat's bow, forbidding anyone to step on it. Then, there is an offering of a garland, or a red cloth tied to the bow of the boat and there is a ceremony to pay homage to the spirit religion.

Later, some people believed Mae Yanang was sacred and protected other vehicles, such as cars and planes. Assuming that the steering wheel is the dwelling place of Mae Yanang, the way of worship is usually tied and hung with a tricolor cloth and a garland.

== Worship ==
Although Mae Yanang is based on animism, which is a traditional belief system in Thailand, it was especially respected by Thai fishermen. Most fishermen believed that every fishing boat contained the spirits of Mae Yanang. When the fishermen go out of the boat to catch fish every time, they have to pay respects to Mae Yanang in order to have auspiciousness for occupation and in order for Mae Ya Nang Ruea to protect and protect them from harm.

In Samut Sakhon, the equipment used in the ceremony to pay respect to Mae Ya Nang Ruea, such as Khanom Janab, duck, dried squid, pork belly, rice, 3 kinds of fruits, tricolor cloth, silver paper, gold paper, 1 handful of incense, 1 handful of flowers, 1 bowl of water, 1 handful of pomegranate twigs.

In the ceremony, the owner of the boat will bring snacks, ducks, dried squid, pork belly, rice, fruits, tricolor cloth, silver paper, gold paper, flowers, water, pomegranate twigs, put them on a tray, put the tray on the boat's pantry, and light incense to say the summoning of Mae Ya Nang Ruea. receive an offering as well as to pray for protection and protection from dangers and to achieve a stable occupation Then bring the tricolor cloth, flowers and incense to tie the pantomime on the boat. Burning silver paper, gold paper, setting firecrackers, sprinkling water from the bowl with pomegranate branches all over the hull. Subsequently, the ship began to sail.

The fishermen believed that the Khon Boat was the residence of Mae Ya Nang Ruea, so the Khon Boat was considered the most important part of the boat. and is the captain of the ship therefore respect and respect and prohibit anyone from kicking, stepping on, sitting, standing, crossing, or doing anything that is insulting to the ship's pantomime. With the belief that if someone disrespects the ship, it will bring trouble and misfortune to the ship's owner and crew.

== In pop culture ==
Beliefs about Mae Yanang from Thailand's spiritism and spiritualism have been mentioned and play a large role in Thai literature such as Princess Pikunthong and was made into a movie in 1970 in the name of Mae Yanang, after which it was brought back to create a television drama in 1996 in the name of Mae Yanang of the Army Color Television Channel. 7 and received a new remake again in a new name, Sang Nang Prai, in the year 2019 on Channel 8.

At present, there is still a belief that Mae Yanang can live in the car as well. Following worshipping instructions are believe to help procure safety while driving.
