= Miss Grand Chonburi =

Provincial pageant in Chonburi, Thailand

Miss Grand Chonburi มิสแกรนด์ชลบุรี
- Formation: May 14, 2016; 10 years ago
- Founder: Chintichet Rungsritrakul
- Type: Beauty pageant
- Headquarters: Chonburi
- Location: Thailand
- Official language: Thai
- Provincial Director: Chirathivat Supharattanaseree (2024–present)
- Affiliations: Miss Grand Thailand

Summary result of Chonburi representatives at Miss Grand Thailand
| Placement | Number(s) |
|---|---|
| Winner | 1 |
| 1st runner-up | 0 |
| 2nd runner-up | 0 |
| 3rd runner-up | 1 |
| 4th runner-up | 0 |
| Top 10/11/12 | 0 |
| Top 20/21 | 3 |
| Unplaced | 4 |

Miss Grand Chonburi (Thai: มิสแกรนด์ชลบุรี) is a Thai provincial beauty pageant which selects a representative from Chonburi province to the Miss Grand Thailand national competition. It was founded in 2016 by a cabin crew, Chintichet Rungsritrakul (ชินธิเชษฐ รุ่งศรีตระกูล).

Chonburi has won the Miss Grand Thailand title once by Patthama Jitsawat in 2026.

== History ==
In 2016, after Miss Grand Thailand began franchising the provincial competitions to individual organizers, who would name seventy-seven provincial titleholders to compete in the national pageant. The license for Chonburi province was granted to Chintichet Rungsritrakul, who organized the first Miss Grand Chonburi contest on May 14, 2016, in Pattaya and named a model Pinicha Kitkasempongsa the winner. Rungsritrakul relinquished the license to Kamolthanat Kotutha the following year.

The pageant was skipped once; in 2021, due to the COVID-19 pandemic in Thailand, the national organizer was unable to organize the national event, and the country representative for the international tournament was appointed instead.

Winner gallery

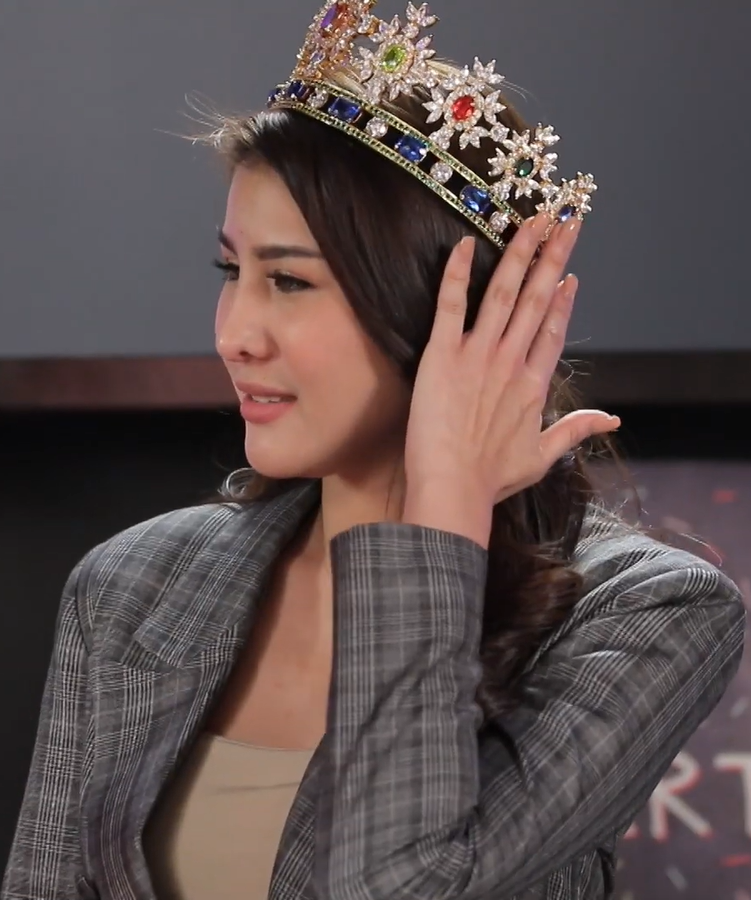
Pinicha Kitkasempongsa,
Miss Grand Chonburi 2016

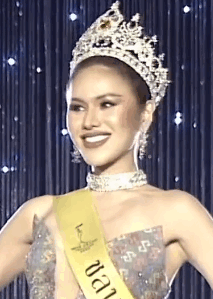
Watcharaporn Ruaypong,
Miss Grand Chonburi 2022

File:Ning_Pattama_In_2025.png |

Patthama Jitsawat,
Miss Grand Chonburi 2026

== Editions ==
The following table details Miss Grand Chonburi's annual editions since 2016.

| Edition | Date | Final venue | Entrants | Winner | Ref. |
|---|---|---|---|---|---|
| 1st | May 14, 2016 | CentralFestival Pattaya Beach, Pattaya, Chonburi | 7 | Pinicha Kitkasempongsa | |
| 2nd | March 25, 2017 | CentralFestival Pattaya Beach, Pattaya, Chonburi | 12 | Sudaporn Wongsasiriphat | |
| 3rd | May 20, 2018 | CentralFestival Pattaya Beach, Pattaya, Chonburi | 8 | Kanyanee Dechkrut | |
| 4th | April 25, 2019 | Terminal 21 Pattaya, Pattaya, Chonburi | 12 | Wachiranya Aumnoi | |
| 5th | August 9, 2020 | CentralFestival Pattaya Beach, Pattaya, Chonburi | 31 | Wanida Dokkulap | |
| 6th | February 2022 | CentralFestival Pattaya Beach, Pattaya, Chonburi | 12 | Watcharaporn Ruayphong | |
| 7th | November 29, 2022 | CentralFestival Pattaya Beach, Pattaya, Chonburi | 11 | Kritsadaporn Nakrai (Note: Later dethroned, the 2nd runner-up, Ratrapee Thamchaikun, was elected as the replacement.) | |
| 8th | November 11, 2023 | Colosseum Show Teatre, Pattaya, Chonburi | 10 | Nutthakan Kunchayawanat | |
| 6th | December 6, 2024 | Thachang Bangsean Pub, Mueang Chonburi | 12 | Orrapatsaya Suksai | |

== National competition ==
The following is a list of Chonburi representatives who competed at the Miss Grand Thailand pageant.

| Year | Representative | | Original provincial title | Placement at Miss Grand Thailand | Provincial director | Ref. |
| Year | Romanized name | Thai name | Original provincial title | Placement at Miss Grand Thailand | Provincial director | Ref. |
|---|---|---|---|---|---|---|
| 2016 | Pinicha Kitkasempongsa | พิณิชา กิจเกษมพงศา | Miss Grand Chonburi 2016 | 3rd runner-up | Chintichet Rungsritrakul | |
| 2017 | Sudaporn Wongsasiriphat | สุดาภรณ์ วงศาศิริพัฒน์ | Miss Grand Chonburi 2017 | Unplaced | Kamolthanat Kotutha | |
| 2018 | Kanyanee Dechkrut | กัญญาณี เดชครุฑ | Miss Grand Chonburi 2018 | Unplaced | Ravee Osombat | |
| 2019 | Wachiranya Aumnoi | วชิรญาณ์ อ่วมน้อย | Miss Grand Chonburi 2019 | Unplaced | Nanyaphat Kotchasan | |
| 2020 | Wanida Dokkulap | วนิดา ดอกกุหลาบ | Miss Grand Chonburi 2020 | Top 20 | Nanyaphat Kotchasan | |
| 2021 | No national pageant due to the COVID-19 pandemic. | | | | | |
| 2022 | Watcharaporn Ruayphong | วัชราภรณ์ รวยพงษ์ | Miss Grand Chonburi 2022 | Top 20 | Nanyaphat Kotchasan | |
| 2023 | Kritsadaporn Nakrai | กฤษฎาภรณ์ นาใคร | Miss Grand Chonburi 2023 | Dethroned | Pimpisa Trongthosak | |
| 2023 | Ratrapee Thamchaikun | รัตน์ระพี ธรรมใจกุล | 2nd runner-up Miss Grand Chonburi 2023 | Unplaced | Pimpisa Trongthosak | |
| 2024 | Natthakaan Kunchayawanat | นัทกาญจน์ กุลชยวณัฐ | Miss Grand Chonburi 2024 | Top 20 | Chirathivat; Supharattanaseree | |
| 2025 | Orrapatsaya Suksai | อรภัสญาน์ สุกใส | Miss Grand Chonburi 2025 | Unplaced | Chirathivat; Supharattanaseree | |
| 2026 | Patthama Jitsawat | ปัทมา จิตรสวัสดิ์ | Miss Grand Chonburi 2026 | Winner | Chirathivat; Supharattanaseree | |
