= Miss Grand Kanchanaburi =

Provincial pageant in Kanchanaburi, Thailand

Miss Grand Kanchanaburi มิสแกรนด์กาญจนบุรี
- Formation: April 17, 2016; 10 years ago
- Founder: Paoramin Srisuk
- Type: Beauty pageant
- Headquarters: Kanchanaburi
- Location: Thailand
- Official language: Thai
- Provincial Director: Napasanan Kamolsitthiphan (2019–present)
- Affiliations: Miss Grand Thailand

Summary result of Kanchanaburi representatives at Miss Grand Thailand
Placement	Number(s)
Winner	0
1st runner-up	0
2nd runner-up	0
3rd runner-up	0
4th runner-up	0
5th runner-up	0
Top 10/11/12	0
Top 20/21	1
Unplaced	8

Miss Grand Kanchanaburi (Thai: มิสแกรนด์กาญจนบุรี) is a Thai provincial beauty pageant which selects a representative from Kanchanaburi province to the Miss Grand Thailand national competition. It was founded in 2016 by a local organizer Paoramin Srisuk (ปรมินทร์ ศรีสุข).

Kanchanaburi representatives have yet to win the Miss Grand Thailand title. The highest and only placement they obtained in the contest was in the top 20 finalists, achieved in 2022 by Thansita Dilhokanansakul.

== History ==
In 2016, after Miss Grand Thailand began franchising the provincial competitions to individual organizers, who would name seventy-seven provincial titleholders to compete in the national pageant. The license for Kanchanaburi province was granted to a local organizer Paoramin Srisuk, who organized the first Miss Grand Kanchanaburi contest in April 2016 and named Putthida Samainiyom the winner. In June 2016, the license was transferred to another organizer because Srisuk could not fulfill an agreement he had signed with the national organ.

The pageant was skipped in 2022; due to the COVID-19 pandemic in Thailand, the national organizer was unable to organize the national event in 2021, the 2021 Miss Grand Kanchanaburi winner was sent to compete in the 2022 national stage instead.

Winner gallery

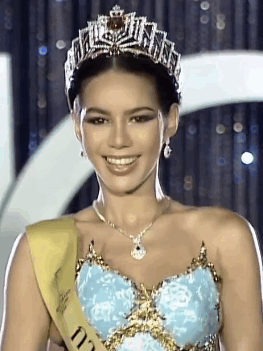
Thansita Dilhokanansakul,
Miss Grand Kanchanaburi 2022

== Editions ==
The following table details Miss Grand Kanchanaburi's annual editions since 2016.

Edition	Date	Final venue	Entrants	Winner	Ref.
1st	April 17, 2016	No data available	5	Putthida Samainiyom	
2nd	May 2017	Robinson Lifestyle Kanchanaburi, Mueang Kanchanaburi, Kanchanaburi	15	Wararat Tempan	
3rd (Note: As an inter-provincial pageant for Miss Grand Kanchanaburi, Miss Grand Suphan Buri and Miss Grand Chai Nat.)	May 26, 2018	Robinson Lifestyle Kanchanaburi, Mueang Kanchanaburi, Kanchanaburi	20	Chonthicha Kaewbutdee	
4th	April 21, 2019	Robinson Lifestyle Kanchanaburi, Mueang Kanchanaburi, Kanchanaburi	15	Marie Claude Guanziroli	
5th	August 8, 2020	Robinson Lifestyle Kanchanaburi, Mueang Kanchanaburi, Kanchanaburi	15	Nattharawi Chiarasathit	
6th	June 21, 2021	Robinson Lifestyle Kanchanaburi, Mueang Kanchanaburi, Kanchanaburi	15	Thansita Dilhokanansakul	
7th	January 14, 2023	60th Anniversary of the King Hall, Mueang Kanchanaburi, Kanchanaburi	8	Araya Yuangsua	
8th	December 30, 2023	60th Anniversary of the King Hall, Mueang Kanchanaburi, Kanchanaburi	9	Kultida Thonglerd	
9th	January 4, 2025	Merlin Hut & Farm, Mueang Kanchanaburi, Kanchanaburi	11	Satiwan Kanbuppha	

== National competition ==
The following is a list of Kanchanaburi representatives who competed at the Miss Grand Thailand pageant.

Year	Representative		Original provincial title	Placement at Miss Grand Thailand	Provincial director	Ref.
Year	Romanized name	Thai name	Original provincial title	Placement at Miss Grand Thailand	Provincial director	Ref.
2016	Putthida Samainiyom	พุทธิดา สมัยนิยม	Miss Grand Kanchanaburi 2016	Unplaced	Porramin Srisuk	
2017	Wararat Tempan	วรารัตน์ เต็มปัน	Miss Grand Kanchanaburi 2017	Unplaced	Unknown	
2018	Chonthicha Kaewbutdee	ชลธิชา แก้วบุตรดี	Miss Grand Kanchanaburi 2018	Unplaced	Patima Kritchamaiphak	
2019	Marie Claude Guanziroli	มารี โคลด์ กวนซิโรริ	Miss Grand Kanchanaburi 2019	Unplaced	Napasanan Sombunthrap	
2020	Nattharawi Chiarasathit	ณัฐระวี เจียรสถิตย์	Miss Grand Kanchanaburi 2020	Unplaced	Napasanan Sombunthrap	
2021	No national pageant due to the COVID-19 pandemic.					
2022	Thansita Dilhokanansakul	ธันย์สิตา ดิลกอนันต์สกุล	Miss Grand Kanchanaburi 2021/22	Top 20	Napasanan Kamolsitthiphan	
2023	Araya Yuangsua	อารยา เยื่องเสือ	Miss Grand Kanchanaburi 2023	Unplaced	Napasanan Kamolsitthiphan	
2024	Kultida Thonglerd	กุลธิดา ทองเลิศ	Miss Grand Kanchanaburi 2024	Unplaced	Napasanan Kamolsitthiphan	
2025	Satiwan Kanbuppha	สตีวรรณ เคนบุปผา	Miss Grand Kanchanaburi 2025	Unplaced	Napasanan Kamolsitthiphan	
