= Miss Grand Nakhon Ratchasima =

Provincial pageant in Nakhon Ratchasima, Thailand

Miss Grand ฺNakhon Ratchasima Miss Grand Korat มิสแกรนด์นครราชสีมา มิสแกรนด์โคราช
- Formation: May 8, 2016; 9 years ago
- Founder: Cheewanat Suphattarobon
- Type: Beauty pageant
- Headquarters: Nakhon Ratchasima
- Location: Thailand
- Official language: Thai
- Director: Panicha Thanaseelangkun (2024–present)
- Affiliations: Miss Grand Thailand

Summary result of Nakhon Ratchasima representatives at Miss Grand Thailand
Placement	Number(s)
Winner	0
1st runner-up	0
2nd runner-up	0
3rd runner-up	0
4th runner-up	0
Top 10/11/12	1
Top 20/21	2
Unplaced	5

Miss Grand Nakhon Ratchasima or Miss Grand Korat (Thai: มิสแกรนด์นครราชสีมา or มิสแกรนด์โคราช) is a Thai provincial beauty pageant which selects a representative from Nakhon Ratchasima province to the Miss Grand Thailand national competition. It was founded in 2016 by a local organizer Cheewanat Suphattarobon (ชีวณัฏฐ์ สุภัทโรบล).

Nakhon Ratchasima representatives have yet to win the Miss Grand Thailand title. The highest placement they obtained was in the fifth runners-up team (Top 10), won by Rina Chat-amornchai in 2023.

== History ==
In 2016, after Miss Grand Thailand began franchising the provincial competitions to individual organizers, who would name seventy-seven provincial titleholders to compete in the national pageant. The license for Nakhon Ratchasima province was granted to a local organizer, Cheewanat Suphattarobon, who organized the first Miss Grand Nakhon Ratchasima pageant in Mueang Nakhon Ratchasima on May 8, 2016, and named Charinee Khudpho the winner. Suphattarobon relinquished the license to Kritsana Khwangram (กฤษณา ขวางรัมย์) in 2018.

The 2023 edition was the only Miss Grand Nakhon Ratchasima contest co-organizing with another provincial stage, Miss Grand Buriram.

The pageant was skipped once; in 2021, due to the COVID-19 pandemic in Thailand, the national organizer was unable to organize the national event, and the country representative for the international tournament was appointed instead.

Winner gallery

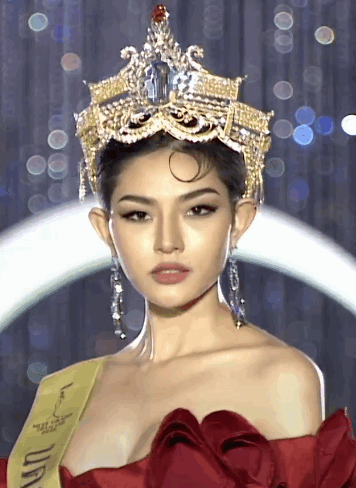
Nattha Siriwongsakul,
Miss Grand Nakhon Ratchasima 2022

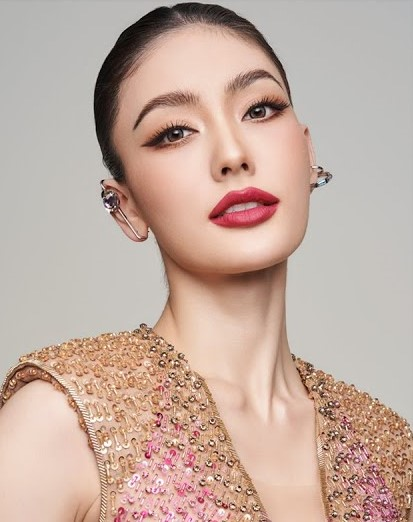
Rina Chat-amornchai,
Miss Grand Nakhon Ratchasima 2023

== Editions ==
The following table details Miss Grand Nakhon Ratchasima's annual editions since 2016.

Edition	Date	Final venue	Entrants	Winner	Ref.
1st	May 8, 2016	Convention Hall, V-One Hotel, Mueang Nakhon Ratchasima	20	Charinee Khudpho	
2nd	February 5, 2017	Convention Hall, V-One Hotel, Mueang Nakhon Ratchasima	10	Charintip Chimpakwan	
3rd	March 16, 2018	MCC Hall, The Mall Nakhon Ratchasima, Mueang Nakhon Ratchasima	20	Monphasorn Rittha	
4th	March 17, 2019	MCC Hall, The Mall Nakhon Ratchasima, Mueang Nakhon Ratchasima	13	Kamonchanok Lonut	
5th	February 17, 2020	MCC Hall, The Mall Nakhon Ratchasima, Mueang Nakhon Ratchasima	20	Paphatsara Angyot	
6th	February 19, 2022	MCC Hall, The Mall Nakhon Ratchasima, Mueang Nakhon Ratchasima	9	Nattha Sirichaiwongsakun	
7th (Note: As an inter-provincial pageant for Miss Grand Nakhon Ratchasima–Buriram.)	December 25, 2022	MCC Hall, The Mall Nakhon Ratchasima, Mueang Nakhon Ratchasima	17	Rina Chat-amornchai	
8th	September 15, 2023	MCC Hall, The Mall Nakhon Ratchasima, Mueang Nakhon Ratchasima	14	Nanticha Yangwattana	
9th	August 24, 2024	Korat Hall, Central Korat, Mueang Nakhon Ratchasima	15	Sirisopha Chaipuriwong	
10th	October 26, 2025	Korat Hall, Central Korat, Mueang Nakhon Ratchasima	20	Jariya Phetbanphaeng	

== National competition ==
The following is a list of Nakhon Ratchasima representatives who competed at the Miss Grand Thailand pageant.

Year	Representative		Original provincial title	Placement at Miss Grand Thailand	Provincial director	Ref.
Year	Romanized name	Thai name	Original provincial title	Placement at Miss Grand Thailand	Provincial director	Ref.
2016	Charinee Khudpho	ชาริณีย์ ขุดโพธิ์	Miss Grand Nakhon Ratchasima 2016	Top 20	Cheewanat Suphattarobon	
2017	Charintip Chimpakwan	ชรินทร์ทิพย์ ฉิมผักแว่น	Miss Grand Nakhon Ratchasima 2017	Unplaced	Cheewanat Suphattarobon	
2018	Monphasorn Rittha	มนต์ภัสสร ฤทธิ์ธา	Miss Grand Nakhon Ratchasima 2018	Top 20	Kritsana Khwangram	
2019	Kamonchanok Lonut	กมลชนก โลนุช	Miss Grand Nakhon Ratchasima 2019	Unplaced	Jarupak Praneetphonkrang	
2020	Paphatsara Angyot	ปภัสรา อังค์ยศ	Miss Grand Nakhon Ratchasima 2020	Unplaced	Jarupak Praneetphonkrang	
2021	No national pageant due to the COVID-19 pandemic.					
2022	Nattha Sirichaiwongsakun	ณัฐฐา ศิริชัยวงศ์สกุล	Miss Grand Nakhon Ratchasima 2021/22	Unplaced	Jarupak Praneetphonkrang	
2023	Rina Chat-amornchai	ริณา ฉัตรอมรชัย	Miss Grand Nakhon Ratchasima 2023	5th runner-up	Supachai Chunhacha	
2024	Nanticha Yangwattana	นันทิชา ยังวัฒนา	Miss Grand Nakhon Ratchasima 2024	Unplaced	Panicha Thanaseelangkun	
2025	Sirisopha Chaipuriwong	ศิริโสภา ไชยปุริยวงศ์	Miss Grand Nakhon Ratchasima 2025	Unplaced	Panicha Thanaseelangkun	
2026	Jariya Phetbanphaeng	จริยา เพชรบ้านแพง	Miss Grand Nakhon Ratchasima 2026			
