= Miss Grand Thailand 2025 =

12th Miss Grand Thailand competition, beauty pageant edition

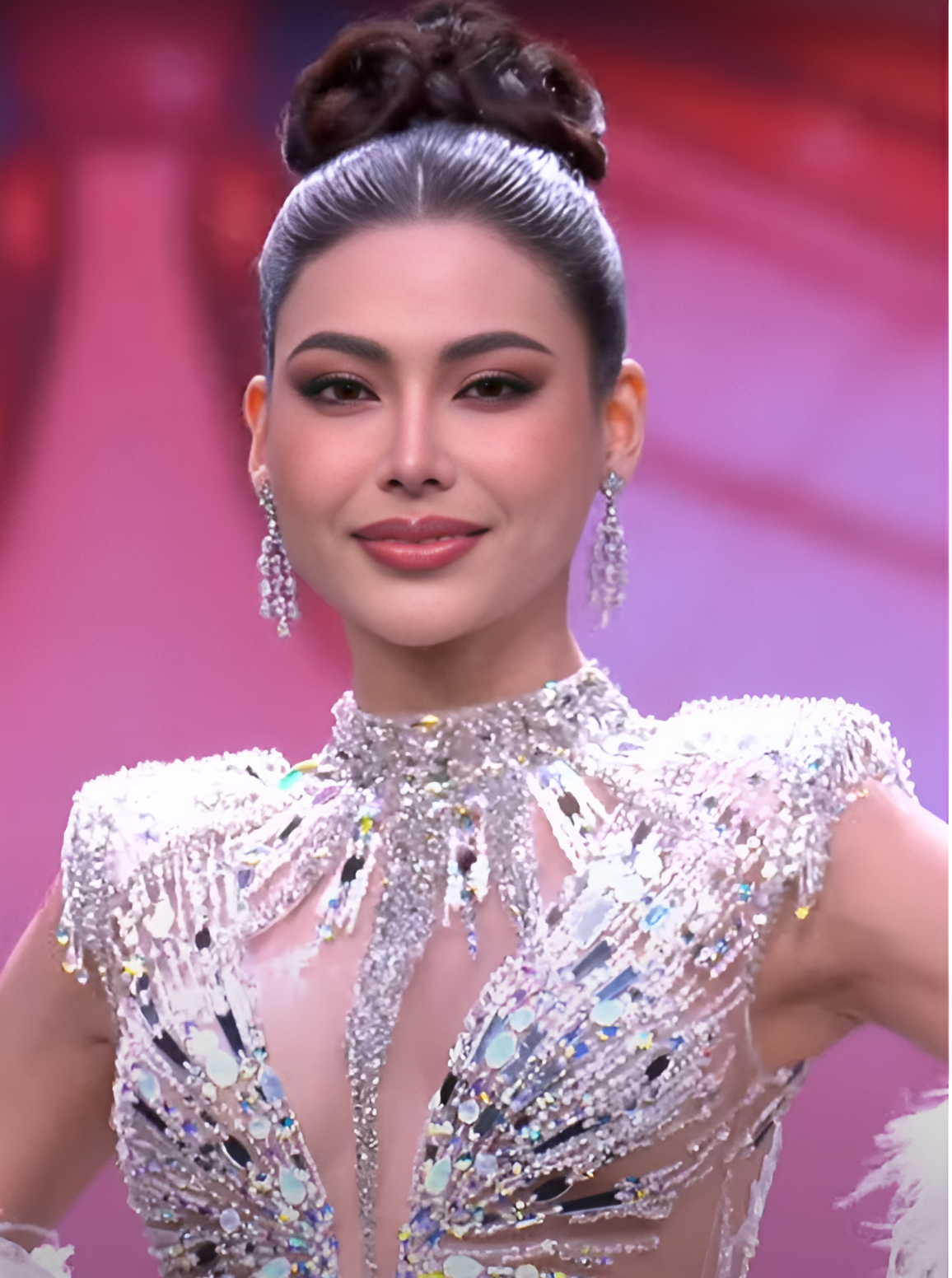
- Sarunrat Puagpipat, Miss Grand Thailand 2025
- Date: 29 March 2025
- Presenters: Matthew Deane
- Theme: A Star is Born
- Venue: MGI Hall, Bravo BKK Mall, Bangkok
- Broadcaster: YouTube
- Entrants: 77
- Placements: 20
- Winner: Sarunrat Puagpipat (Phuket)
- Best National Costume: Arthitaya Jaithiang (Loei); Ornchada Chaiyasarn (Phitsanulok); Jirapat Dathumma (Samut Prakan)
- Photogenic: Chutima Sodapak; (Phrae)
- Best in Swimsuit: Ilin Nabsuk (Kalasin)

External videos
- Preliminary round
- Grand finals

Miss Grand Thailand 2025 (Thai: มิสแกรนด์ไทยแลนด์ 2025) was the 12th edition of the Miss Grand Thailand pageant, held on 29 March 2025 at the MGI Hall, Bravo BKK Mall, Bangkok. Contestants from seventy-seven provinces of the country competed for the title.

The contest was won by Sarunrat Puagpipat of Phuket, making her the third representative from her province to win the title, securing the first back-to-back victory for Phuket. Puagpipat was crowned by preceding Miss Grand Thailand 2024 Malin Chara-anan. She represented Thailand at the Miss Grand International 2025 pageant in Bangkok, where she finished as 1st runner-up.

The event was live-transmitted to audiences worldwide via the pageant's YouTube channel, GrandTV, with a Thai-Australian television personality Matthew Deane as the host. In the event, Pattaya was announced as the preliminary host city for the competition the following year.

== Background ==
=== Selection of host province ===
At the grand coronation night of Miss Grand Thailand 2024 held on 6 March 2024, in addition to crowning the winner, the host of the event also announced Songkhla province as the host for the Miss Grand Thailand 2025 pageant BootCamp with a local entrepreneur and 2025 Miss Grand Songkhla director, Araya To-Kasub (อารยา โต๊ะกะสุบ), as the coordinator.

Initially, Songkhla province was selected as the preliminary host province for the 2024 national pageant, but due to the opposing political views between the organizer, which supports the center-left parties in the 2023 Thai general election, and the local governments, which support right-wing politics, as well as the conflict between the national director, Nawat Itsaragrisil, and a former Miss Grand Songkhla provincial director, Chanpen Parisuttho-Namchanda, who disagreed with expressing political opinions on the beauty pageant stage, the plan was canceled, and Phuket province was elected as the replacement.

=== Location and date ===
According to the press conference held on 3 September 2024, the pageant activities were scheduled for 23 February to March 29, 2025. Its main events are listed as follows.

Host province: Songkhla

Main venue: The Signature Hotel Airport, Hat Yai

- 15 March: Southern Thai costume contest
- 16 March: Swimsuit contest
- 17 March: Miss Darling of Songkhla

Host province: Bangkok

Main venue: MGI Hall, Bravo BKK Mall

- 24 March: National costume contest
- 25 March: Grand Voice contest
- 26 March: Preliminary round
- 29 March: Grand coronation

=== Selection of contestants ===
As with all prior editions, the appointment of provincial representatives was prohibited. All competitors were selected through 57 regional pageants conducted across 36 provinces to identify the 77 provincial titleholders. However, since there was no restrictive rule that the provincial contests had to be held in that respective province; hence, 30 provincial representatives (approx. 40% of the total) were awarded titles at the event held in the Bangkok Metropolitan. In certain instances, multiple provincial titles are conferred in a single competition.

The following details provinces that organized regional contests for Miss Grand Thailand 2025.

Host province	Provincial titles	Total titles
Bangkok	Event 1: Chumphon and Phichit / Event 2: Chai Nat; Event 3: Suphan Buri and Mukdahan / Event 4: Kamphaeng Phet; Event 5: Nong Bua Lamphu / Event 6: Phrae; Event 7: Prachinburi and Sa Kaeo / Event 8: Samut Sakhon; Event 9: Loei / Event 10 Pathum Thani	13
Nonthaburi	Event 1: Nakhon Pathom and Nan / Event 2: Saraburi; Event 3: Sakon Nakhon and Satun / Event 4: Kalasin; Event 5: Krabi and Phang Nga / Event 6: Nakhon Phanom; Event 7: Nakhon Nayok and Ang Thong / Event 8: Bangkok	12
Chiang Mai	Event 1: Chiang Mai / Event 2: Chiang Rai; Event 3: Lampang and Lamphun	4
Chonburi	Event 1: Chonburi / Event 2: Yala, Pattani, and Narathiwat	4
Khon Kaen	Event 1: Khon Kaen and Phatthalung / Event 2: Bueng Kan	3
Nakhon Sawan	Nakhon Sawan, Phayao, and Sing Buri	3
Nakhon Si Thammarat	Nakhon Si Thammarat, Surin, and Sukhothai	3
Pathumthani	Event 1: Trang / Event 2: Mae Hong Son	2
Surat Thani	Nonthaburi and Surat Thani	2
Si Sa Ket	Sisaket and Ranong.	2
Ubon Ratchathani	Ubon Ratchathani and Phetchabun	2
Samut Sakhon	Samut Songkhram and Amnat Charoen	2
Tak	Tak and Uthai Thani	2
Provincial pageants that were held in their respective provinces with 1 title/pageant/province		23
Buriram, Chachoengsao, Chaiyaphum, Chanthaburi, Kanchanaburi, Lopburi, Maha Sarakham, Nakhon Ratchasima, Nong Khai, Phetchaburi, Phitsanulok, Phra Nakhon Si Ayutthaya, Phuket, Prachuap Khiri Khan, Ratchaburi, Rayong, Roi Et, Samut Prakan, Songkhla, Trat, Udon Thani, Uttaradit, Yasothon		23
Total provincial titles		77

== Results ==
=== Placements ===
Miss Grand Thailand 2025 winner received BT฿1,500,000 (US$46,904) cash prize, one unit of condominium, and others. Meanwhile, the 1st, 2nd, 3rd, and 4th runner-up received a cash prize of BT฿800K, BT฿700K, BT฿600K, and BT฿500K, respectively. All 5th runners-up gained BT฿100K cash each.

Color keys

For regional group:	For international placement:
N Northern group	The contestant won in an international pageant.
NE Northeastern group	The contestant was a runner-up in an international pageant.
C Central group	The contestant was a semi-finalist in an international pageant.
S Southern group	The contestant was unplaced in an international pageant.

Placement	Contestants	International Placement
Winner	S Phuket – Sarunrat Puagpipat^{[§]}^{[∆]}	1st Runner-up – Miss Grand International 2025
1st runner-up	NE Khon Kaen – Chayathanus Saradatta	Winner – The Miss Globe 2025
2nd runner-up	N Lampang – Natthinee Thanatpornphinyo^{[π]}	
3rd runner-up	N Lamphun – Panichada Kongsawanya	
4th runner-up	C Bangkok – Khanaporn Phatthanaphan	
5th runners-up	S Chumphon – Suphannika Nopparat^{[‡]}	4th runner-up – Face Of Beauty International 2025
5th runners-up	NE Kalasin – Ilin Nabsuk	3rd runner-up – Miss Aura International 2025
5th runners-up	S Phatthalung – Michelle Behrmann	Unplaced – Miss Supranational 2025
5th runners-up	N Phrae – Chutima Sodapak^{[‡]}	
5th runners-up	C Sa Kaeo – Bawonrat Maneerat	2nd runner-up – Miss Asia Pacific International 2025
5th runners-up	S Songkhla – Suchita Oxman	
Top 20	C Chachoengsao – Kanlayawan Phet-in; NE Nakhon Phanom – Cherlin Krai-arayapat; N Nakhon Sawan – Veerin Kaewpuk; N Phitsanulok – Ornchada Chaiyasarn; C Saraburi – Thitaree Phongtharasathorn; NE Sisaket – Pitchapa Justice; C Suphan Buri – Piyaporn Sangsuwan; S Surat Thani – Pawarisa Choosuk; NE Udon Thani – Natthamanee Pitchayasuttisil	

Notes
^∆ Automatically qualified for the Top 11 finalists after winning the fast track "Miss Popular vote".
^§ Automatically qualified for the Top 11 finalists after winning the fast track "Best Seller".
^‡ Personally selected by the pageant president as 1 of the Top 11 finalists via the "Boss Choice" fast track.
^π Personally selected by the pageant president as 1 of the Top 5 finalists via the "Boss Choice" fast track.

=== Main special awards ===
Main special awards for the contestants
Award	Contestant	Prize
Best Southern Thai Costume	Suphan Buri – Piyaporn Sangsuwan	BT฿50,000 (US$1,563)
Best National Costumes	Loei – Arthitaya Jaithiang; Phitsanulok – Ornchada Chaiyasarn; Samut Prakan – Jirapat Dathumma	BT฿50,000 (US$1,563) each
Best Introduction	Surat Thani – Pawarisa Choosuk	BT฿50,000 (US$1,563)
Best in Swimsuit	Kalasin – Ilin Nabsuk	BT฿100,000 (US$3,127)
Best Seller	Phuket – Sarunrat Puagpipat (Note: The winners of the Best Seller Award, Miss Popular Vote, and the Boss Choice will automatically qualify for the top 11 finalists.)	10% of total sales.
Miss Photogenic	Phrae – Chutima Sodapak	BT฿100,000 (US$3,127)
Miss Popular Vote	Phuket – Sarunrat Puagpipat	BT฿50,000 (US$1,563)
Miss Darling of Songkhla	Chumphon – Suphannika Nopparat	BT฿100,000 (US$3,127)
Grand Voice Award	Chachoengsao – Kanlayawan Phet-in; Chaiyaphum – Nattharin Bunnun; Chonburi – Orrapatsaya Suksai; Phetchabun – Thipsuda Manmuang; Phrae – Chutima Sodapak	BT฿30,000 (US$938) each
A Star Is Born Award	Lamphun – Panichada Kongsawanya; Mae Hong Son – Manatsavee Tangplub (Note: Director's Choice); Songkhla – Suchita Oxman	BT฿50,000 (US$1,563) each

Main special awards for provincial backstage team
Award	Position	Team	Prize
Best Provincial Director	Golden Award	Saraburi – Sarinlada Mahakit-akkarapong	Sash and trophy
Best Provincial Director	Silver Awards	Nakhon Sawan – Tassanai Kotthong; Phuket – Teerasak Phonngam; Songkhla – Araya To-kasub; Udon Thani – Yuranun Juntaya	Sash and trophy
Best Designer (Note: Award is given to the designer of the evening gown worn by the contestant in the national preliminary round. From the 2016 to 2018 competitions, this award was directly delivered to the winning contestant under the title Best Evening Gown Award.)	Winner	Phichit – Pachara Kaewkrachang and Athikun Theerawongsuwan of GL Garlate Design	BT฿100,000 (US$3,127)
Best Designer	Runners-up	Narathiwat – Weerapong Kongthong of Sivalai Rahothan; Nakhon Ratchasima – Supachai Yakaew and Dechawat Seenadee of Sucha Garment Korat	BT฿20,000 (US$625) each

=== Ancillary awards ===
Award	Position	Contestants	Prize
Best arrival (Note: Ancillary awards in the first day of the pageant camp.) by CHAT Cosmetics	Winners	Bangkok – Kanaporn Phatthanaphan; Kalasin – Ilin Nabsuk; Nakhon Phanom – Cherlin Krai-arayapat; Phichit – Pitchapa Saeng-aram; Phuket – Sarunrat Puagpipat; Suphan Buri – Piyaporn Sangsuwan	BT฿50,000 (US$1,563) each
Best arrival by CHAT Cosmetics	Runners-up	Chachoengsao – Kanlayawan Phet-in; Chiang Mai – Wisansaya Pakasupakul; Mukdahan – Nathrika Sthapornnawakun; Pathum Thani – Aitsari Rodwised; Ratchaburi – Wikanda Kotkham; Saraburi – Thitaree Phongtharasathorn; Songkhla – Suchita Oxman; Surat Thani – Pawarisa Choosuk	BT฿10,000 (US$313) each
Best Songkhla Costumes (Note: Awarded by the host province.)		Kanchanaburi – Satiwan Kanbuppha; Phitsanulok – Ornchada Chaiyasarn; Phrae – Chutima Sodapak; Phuket – Sarunrat Puagpipat; Saraburi – Thitaree Phongtharasathorn; Suphan Buri – Piyaporn Sangsuwan	BT฿10,000 (US$313) each
Best Performance (Note: Ancillary award in the Best in Swimsuit sub-contest.)		Surat Thani – Pawarisa Choosuk	BT฿30,000 (US$938) cash
Miss 4U2		Phuket – Sarunrat Puagpipat	BT฿50,000 (US$1,563)
Miss Be Fit		Phuket – Sarunrat Puagpipat	BT฿50,000 (US$1,563)
Miss Beautiful Skin		Phuket – Sarunrat Puagpipat	BT฿50,000 (US$1,563)
Best Content Creators		Lampang – Natthinee Thanatpornphinyo; Lamphun – Panichada Kongsawanya	BT฿50,000 (US$1,563) each
Miss Fresh & Soft		Saraburi – Thitaree Phongtharasathorn	BT฿100,000 (US$3,127)
Miss Authodenex		Phuket – Sarunrat Puagpipat	BT฿100,000 (US$3,127)
CHAT Cosmetis Influencer		Phuket – Sarunrat Puagpipat	BT฿100,000 (US$3,127)
Best Viral Content Performance		Phuket – Sarunrat Puagpipat	BT฿100,000 (US$3,127)
Most Popular Creator		Phuket – Sarunrat Puagpipat	BT฿100,000 (US$3,127)
Pan Thong Viral Queen		Khon Kaen – Chayathanus Saradatta	BT฿50,000 (US$1,563)
Pan Thong Fan's Choice		Phuket – Sarunrat Puagpipat	BT฿100,000 (US$3,127)

Notes

Ancillary awards given in the Miss Darling of Songkhla sub-contest
Award	Contestants	Prize
Miss People's Choice	Phuket – Sarunrat Puagpipat	BT฿20,000 (US$625)
Miss Popularity	Khon Kaen – Chayathanus Saradatta	Automatically qualified for the top 22 in the sub-contest.
Miss Miraa	Phuket – Sarunrat Puagpipat	BT฿10,000 (US$313)
Miss Darling of Songkhla H.R.	Chumphon – Suphannika Nopparat	Automatically qualified for the top 12 in the sub-contest.
Miss Good Skin	Phatthalung – Michelle Behrmann	BT฿20,000 (US$625)
Miss Miracle	Udon Thani – Natthamanee Pitchayasuttisil	BT฿10,000 (US$313)

=== Workshop awards ===
Several supplemental awards were delivered in the workshops conducted by the sponsors throughout the pageant period, as detailed below.

List of awards given by ATIPA Shop
Award	Position	Contestants	Prize
Best Seller	Winner	Phuket – Sarunrat Puagpipat	BT฿50,000 (US$1,563)
Best Seller	2nd place	Saraburi – Thitaree Phongtharasathorn	25,000 BT฿ cash
Best Seller	3rd place	Lampang – Natthinee Thanatpornphinyo	20,000 BT฿ cash
Best Seller	Lucky Draw	Nakhon Ratchasima – Sirisopha Chaipuriwong; Phrae – Chutima Sodapak	20,000 BT฿ each

List of awards given by Pan Thong
Award	Position	Contestants	Prize
Best Seller	Winner	Phuket – Sarunrat Puagpipat	30,000 BT฿ cash
Best Seller (Group category)	Winners	Chanthaburi – Nattamon Kaenkrathok; Chumphon – Suphannika Nopparat; Lampang – Natthinee Thanatpornphinyo; Phra Nakhon Si Ayutthaya – Thanchanok Keawpatcha; Phuket – Sarunrat Puagpipat; Prachuap Khiri Khan – Suthida Yarnos; Suphan Buri – Piyaporn Sangsuwan; Ubon Ratchathani – Wanlapha Kanyama	10,000 BT฿ each
Best Seller (Group category)	2nd place	Bangkok – Kanaporn Phatthanaphan; Nakhon Ratchasima – Sirisopha Chaipuriwong; Samut Prakan – Jirapat Dathumma	3,000 BT฿ each
Best Seller (Group category)	3rd place	Chiang Mai – Wisansaya Pakasupakul; Mae Hong Son – Manatsavee Tangplub; Pattani – Ikkyu Sornbal; Phetchaburi – Pancharat Chaiyanboon	2,000 BT฿ each
Best Seller (Group category)	Supple.	Chanthaburi – Nattamon Kaenkrathok; Chiang Mai – Wisansaya Pakasupakul; Kalasin – Ilin Nabsuk; Kamphaeng Phet – Supisara Wattanakitpaisan; Kanchanaburi – Satiwan Kanbuppha; Krabi – Pantepthida Thammee; Nakhon Ratchasima – Sirisopha Chaipuriwong; Nakhon Sawan – Veerin Kaewpuk; Nong Khai – Chanyathida Matiyapak; Nonthaburi – Parnrada Ratchataworaphat; Mukdahan – Nathrika Sthapornnawakun; Pattani – Ikkyu Sornbal; Rayong – Nongnaphat Chenghuat; Roi Et – Kanchutikarn Peerthanatkul; Samut Prakan – Jirapat Dathumma; Saraburi – Thitaree Phongtharasathorn; Satun – Benjawan Suchartpong; Sing Buri – Pinyapat Khairawi; Surin – Rinlita Thanasathianthaweekit; Trat – Sopida Bussarakham; Yala – Phatcharee Praha; Yasothon – Melinyan Pronsinchaunan	1,000 BT฿ each
Best Photoshoot	Winners	Chonburi – Orrapatsaya Suksai; Khon Kaen – Chayathanus Saradatta; Nakhon Sawan – Veerin Kaewpuk; Phatthalung – Michelle Behrmann; Saraburi – Thitaree Phongtharasathorn; Songkhla – Suchita Oxman	10,000 BT฿ each
Best Photoshoot (Group category)	Winners	Chiang Mai – Wisansaya Pakasupakul; Nan – Mutita Champathin; Nong Bua Lamphu – Wanasanan Phengmanee; Ratchaburi – Wikanda Kotkham	20,000 BT฿ each

List of awards given by Aura Rich
Award	Position	Contestants	Prize
Best Seller	Winner	Phuket – Sarunrat Puagpipat	20,000 BT฿ cash
Best Seller	2nd place	Lampang – Natthinee Thanatpornphinyo	10,000 BT฿ cash
Best Seller	3rd place	Khon Kaen – Chayathanus Saradatta; Saraburi – Thitaree Phongtharasathorn	5,000 BT฿ each
Best Presenter	Winners	Bangkok – Kanaporn Phatthanaphan; Chumphon – Suphannika Nopparat; Lampang – Natthinee Thanatpornphinyo; Lamphun – Panichada Kongsawanya; Phatthalung – Michelle Behrmann; Phrae – Chutima Sodapak; Phuket – Saranrat Puagpipat; Saraburi – Thitaree Phongtharasathorn; Songkhla – Suchita Oxman; Udon Thani – Natthamanee Pitchayasuttisil	3,000 BT฿ each

List of awards given by CHAT Cosmetics
Award	Position	Contestants	Prize
Best Seller	Winner	Phuket – Sarunrat Puagpipat	One Tical of Gold
Q&A Challenge	Winners	Sing Buri – Pinyapat Khairawi	Two gold necklaces
Q&A Challenge	Winners	Yasothon – Melinyan Pronsinchaunan	One gold necklace
Q&A Challenge	Winners	Pattani – Ikkyu Sornbal	One gold necklace and ฿8,000 cash
Q&A Challenge	Winners	Bangkok – Kanaporn Phatthanaphan	One gold necklace and ฿6,000 cash
Q&A Challenge	Winners	Lampang – Natthinee Thanatpornphinyo	One gold necklace and ฿2,000 cash
Q&A Challenge	Winners	Kanchanaburi – Satiwan Kanbuppha; Maha Sarakham – Natnicha Si-thao; Sakon Nakhon – Kalyanat Prasomsri; Sisaket – Pitchapa Justice	One gold necklace and ฿1,000 each
Q&A Challenge	Winners	Ratchaburi – Wikanda Kotkham	BT฿9,000 (US$281) cash
Q&A Challenge	Winners	Krabi – Pantepthida Thammee; Rayong – Nongnaphat Chenghuat	BT฿6,000 each
Q&A Challenge	Winners	Nan – Mutita Champathin; Surat Thani – Pawarisa Choosuk	BT฿5,000 each
Q&A Challenge	Winners	Chanthaburi – Nattamon Kaenkrathok; Uthai Thani – Nattakul Samutnoi	BT฿4,000 each
Q&A Challenge	Winners	Chumphon – Suphannika Nopparat; Narathiwat – Ploynita Thanaveerakulwit	BT฿3,000 each
Q&A Challenge	Winners	Chiang Rai – Sasi Nguyenwan; Ranong – Kittiyaphon Buason; Sa Kaeo – Bawonrat Maneerat	BT฿2,000 each
Supp.	Winners	Buriram – Chalinee Sinsawat; Chai Nat – Thawinan Yangyuen; Chiang Mai – Wisansaya Pakasupakul; Lamphun – Panichada Kongsawanya; Mae Hong Son – Manatsavee Tangplub; Mukdahan – Nathrika Sthapornnawakun; Nakhon Nayok – Napasorn Panpanich; Nakhon Sawan – Veerin Kaewpuk; Nong Bua Lamphu – Wanasanan Phengmanee; Nong Khai – Chanyathida Matiyapak; Nonthaburi – Parnrada Ratchataworaphat; Phayao – Milin Pokinyinkom; Phichit – Pitchapa Saeng-aram; Phra Nakhon Si Ayutthaya – Thanchanok Keawpatcha; Prachinburi – Pornpimol Kulap; Prachuap Khiri Khan – Suthida Yarnos; Phrae – Chutima Sodapak; Phuket – Sarunrat Puagpipat; Samut Prakan – Jirapat Dathumma; Samut Sakhon – Pimolkan Khantinarong; Saraburi – Thitaree Phongtharasathorn; Satun – Benjawan Suchartpong; Songkhla – Suchita Oxman; Sukhothai – Lalitchat Ponchaleechai; Surin – Rinlita Thanasathianthaweekit; Tak – Jitsupa Thamrongchaipakorn; Trang – Kirana Sathongklang	1,000 BT฿ each

List of awards given by other sponsors
Award	Position	Contestants	Prize
Best Presentation by Be Fit	Winner	Phuket – Sarunrat Puagpipat	1-year gym training courses; Be Fit With Jess products worth BT฿50,040
Q&A Challenge by Nana Plastic Surgery Hospital	Winner	Nonthaburi – Parnrada Ratchataworaphat	Hermès bracelet and Nana Hospital products
Q&A Challenge by Nana Plastic Surgery Hospital	Top 4	Lamphun – Panichada Kongsawanya; Rayong – Nongnaphat Chenghuat; Trang – Kirana Sathongklang	Souvenir and Nana Hospital products
Q&A Challenge by Nana Plastic Surgery Hospital	Top 9	Chumphon – Suphannika Nopparat; Phrae – Chutima Sodapak; Phuket – Saranrat Puagpipat; Prachuap Khiri Khan – Suthida Yarnos; Surat Thani – Pawarisa Choosuk	None
Most Popular in TikTok by Nana Plastic Surgery Hospital	Winner	Phuket – Sarunrat Puagpipat	Hermès bracelet and Nana Hospital products
Best Seller by Fresh & Soft	Winner	Phuket – Sarunrat Puagpipat	BT฿30,000 (US$938) cash
Best Seller by Fresh & Soft	2nd place	Kalasin – Ilin Nabsuk	BT฿20,000 cash
Best Seller by Fresh & Soft	3rd place	Surat Thani – Pawarisa Choosuk	BT฿10,000 cash
Best Slogan by Authodenex	Winner	Khon Kaen – Chayathanus Saradatta	BT฿10,000 cash
Best Seller by Authodenex	Winner	Phuket – Sarunrat Puagpipat	BT฿10,000 cash
Challenge winners by Miraa	Winners	Chumphon – Suphannika Nopparat; Phatthalung – Michelle Behrmann; Phuket – Sarunrat Puagpipat; Songkhla – Suchita Oxman	BT฿10,000 each
Challenge winners by Miraa	Top 10	Bangkok – Kanaporn Phatthanaphan; Chonburi – Orrapatsaya Suksai; Khon Kaen – Chayathanus Saradatta; Lamphun – Panichada Kongsawanya; Nakhon Phanom – Cherlin Krai-arayapat; Saraburi – Thitaree Phongtharasathorn	None

== Challenges ==
=== Fan votes ===
Miss Popular Vote
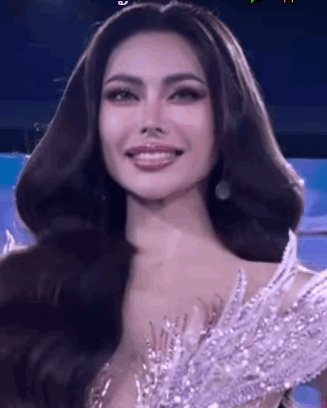
Saranrat Puagpipat (Phuket)

Score
Phuket	39 / 100(39%)
Khon Kaen	34 / 100(34%)
Lamphun	8 / 100(8%)
Lampang	8 / 100(8%)
Sing Buri	1 / 100(1%)
Source: Miss Grand Thailand website

Before the pageant began, the pre-arrival voting challenge was launched on the pageant's Facebook page and Instagram account, where each contestant's portrait was posted. The ten contestants with the most scores, calculated from the number of likes and shares on their portrait photos, acquired the right to attend the special dinner with the pageant president, Nawat Itsaragrisil, on 24 February, at The Emerald Hotel, Bangkok.

Another fan vote is the Miss Popular Vote award, a pay-to-vote challenge that runs on the pageant's official website throughout the pageant period. Saranrat Puagpipat of Phuket was announced the challenge winner on the stage of the grand coronation round, automatically qualifying her for the top 11 finalists.

Pre-arrival voting winners

- Bangkok – Kanaporn Phatthanaphan
- Chumphon – Suphannika Nopparat
- Khon Kaen – Chayathanus Saradatta
- Lampang – Natthinee Thanatpornphinyo
- Lamphun – Panichada Kongsawanya
- Phatthalung – Michelle Behrmann
- Phrae – Chutima Sodapak
- Phuket – Saranrat Puagpipat
- Saraburi – Thitaree Phongtharasathorn
- Udon Thani – Natthamanee Pitchayasuttisil

=== Casting: A Star Is Born project ===
The project aims to select actresses to sign contracts under the MGI PCL. The procedure is divided into three stages: the audition, the second, and the final-interview rounds.

Position	Contestants
Winners	Lamphun – Panichada Kongsawanya; Mae Hong Son – Manatsavee Tangplub; Songkhla – Suchita Oxman
Top 12	Bangkok – Kanaporn Phatthanaphan; Chonburi – Orrapatsaya Suksai; Chumphon – Suphannika Nopparat; Nakhon Phanom – Cherlin Krai-arayapat; Nakhon Sawan – Veerin Kaewpuk; Phatthalung – Michelle Behrmann; Phuket – Saranrat Puagpipat; Saraburi – Thitaree Phongtharasathorn; Sa Kaeo – Bawonrat Maneerat; Sing Buri – Pinyapat Khairawi
Top 32	Buriram – Chalinee Sinsawat; Chachoengsao – Kanlayawan Phet-in; Chiang Mai – Wisansaya Pakasupakul; Chiang Rai – Sasi Nguyenwan; Chai Nat – Thawinan Yangyuen; Kalasin – Ilin Nabsuk; Khon Kaen – Chayathanus Saradatta; Krabi – Pantepthida Thammee; Nakhon Ratchasima – Sirisopha Chaipuriwong; Narathiwat – Ploynita Thanaveerakulwit; Nonthaburi – Parnrada Ratchataworaphat; Pathum Thani – Aitsari Rodwised; Phayao – Milin Pokinyinkom; Phetchabun – Thipsuda Manmuang; Phitsanulok – Ornchada Chaiyasarn; Rayong – Nongnaphat Chenghuat; Samut Prakan – Jirapat Dathumma; Satun – Benjawan Suchartpong; Suphan Buri – Piyaporn Sangsuwan; Udon Thani – Natthamanee Pitchayasuttisil

=== Best Songkhla Costumes ===
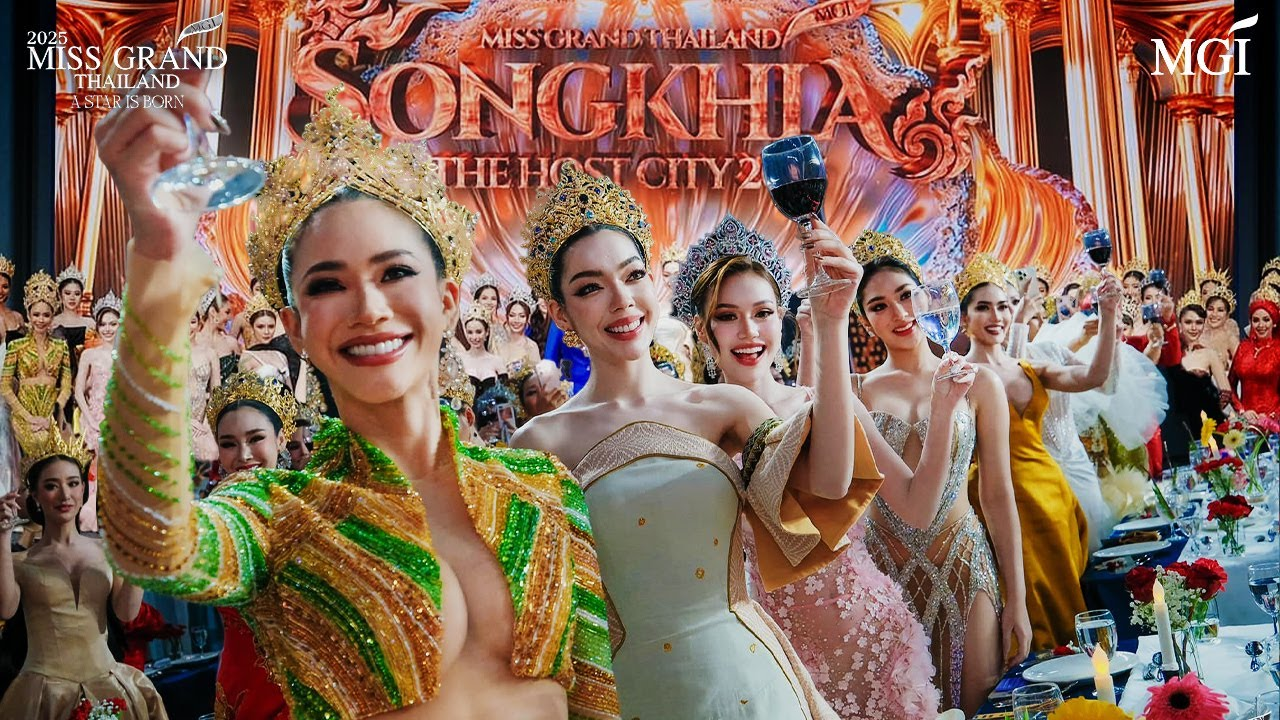
Miss Grand Thailand 2025 contestants at the welcome gala dinner held in the preliminary host province, Songkhla, on 10 March 2025.

External videos
- Songkhla Costumes parade, 14 March 2025

The award was delivered on 14 March 2025 at the fashion show under the concept of The Signature of Songkhla (Thai: ของดีจังหวัดสงขลา) in which all contestants paraded in the costumes that reflect the identity of the host city, Songkhla province. The show was staged on the Senahanusorn walking street (ถนนคนเดินเสน่หานุสรณ์) in Hat Yai with the Mayor of Hat Yai Municipality, Sakorn Thongmunee (สาคร ทองมุณี), and the pageant president Nawat Itsaragrisil as the judges.

Six costumes were announced as the winners, as detailed below.

1. Kanchanaburi – Satiwan Kanbuppha
2. Phitsanulok – Ornchada Chaiyasarn
3. Phrae – Chutima Sodapak
4. Phuket – Saranrat Puagpipat
5. Saraburi – Thitaree Phongtharasathorn
6. Suphan Buri – Piyaporn Sangsuwan

=== Best Seller ===
The Best Seller challenge was used to select 1 contestant who would advance to the final 11 in the grand final competition based on MGI's product sales volume via live streaming on the TikTok platform. The selection is divided into 4 rounds to select the 25, 10, 5, and 2 finalists respectively. Each contestant received 10% of their sales as a prize.

The pre-final round of competition was conducted on March 23 to determine the final 2 finalists. These 2 finalists then competed against each other in the final round organized at the MGI Hall, Bravo BKK Mall, on 25 March, and was live transmitted to the viewer via the pageant's Facebook page. Saranrat Puagpipat of Phuket won the challenge, automatically qualifying her for the top 11 finalists in the grand final round.

Final round: Best Seller Award
25 March 2025, 9:30 PM – 26 March, 0:00 AM

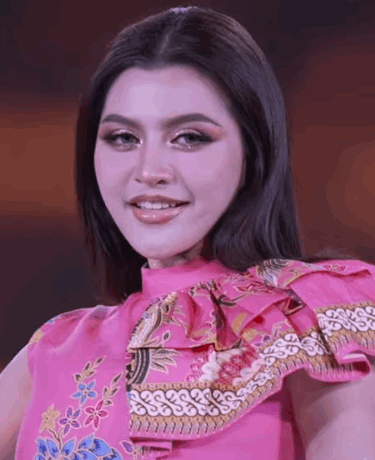

Province:
Lampang

Province:
Phuket

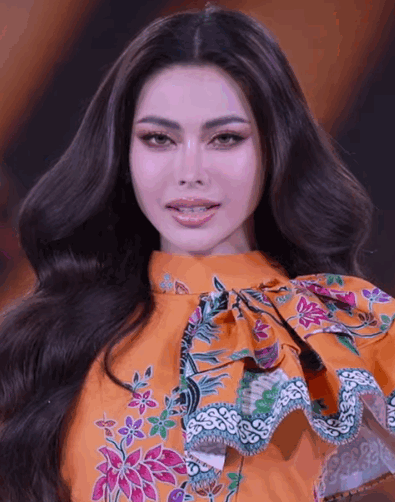

Candidate:
Natthinee Thanatpornphinyo

Candidate:
Saranrat Puagpipat
Sales volume:
BT฿3,311,961 (US$103,564)

Sales volume:
BT฿6,153,916 (US$192,430)
34.99%
65.01%

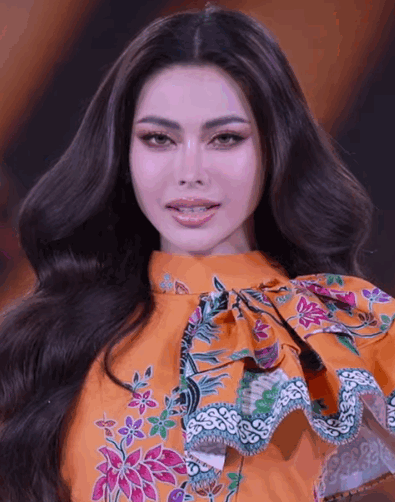
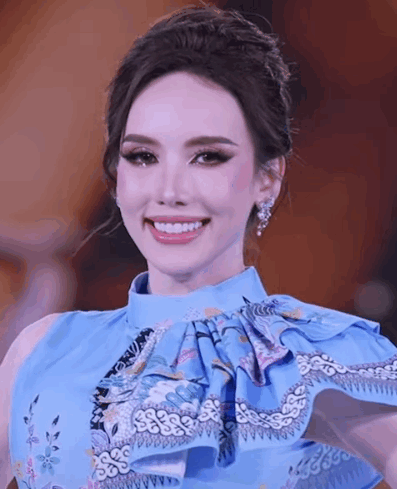
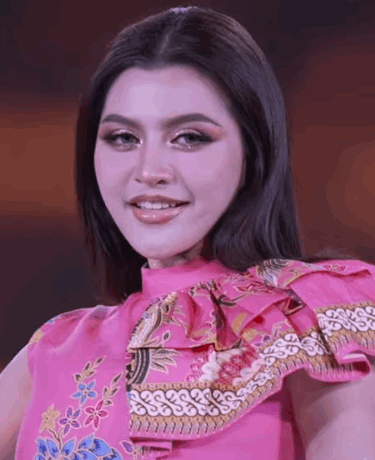
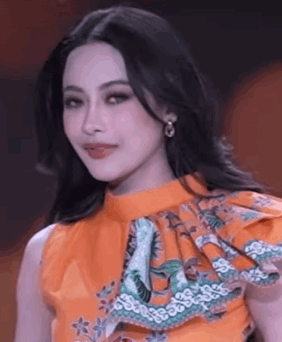
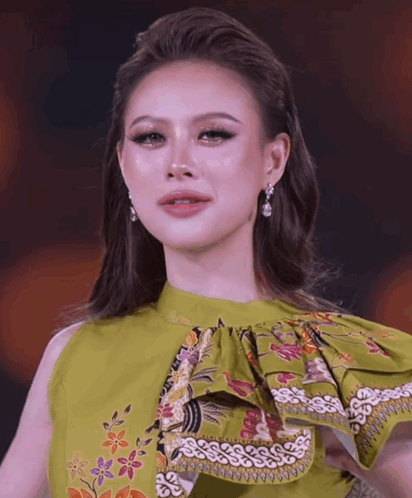
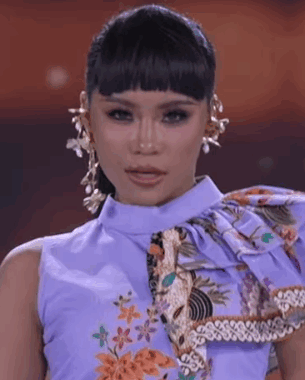
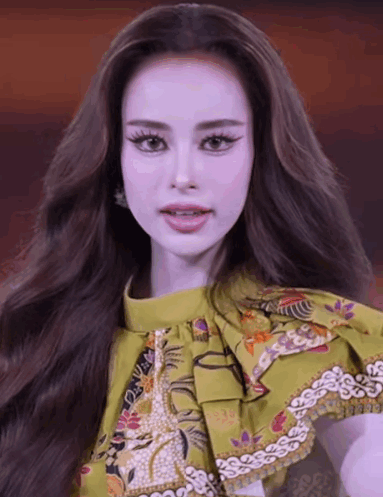
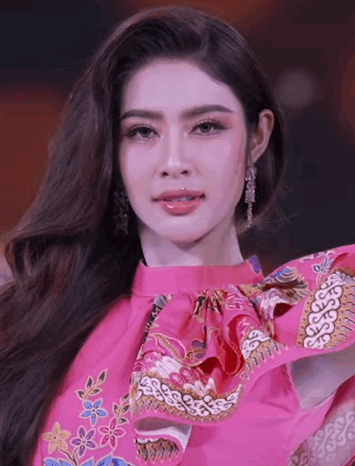
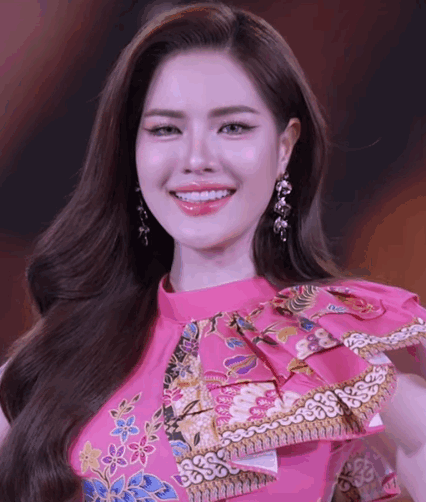
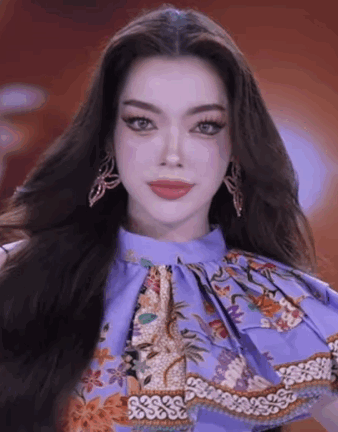
Pre-final round
Team 1		Team 2		Team 3		Team 4		Team 5
Challenger	Assistant	Challenger	Assistant	Challenger	Assistant	Challenger	Assistant	Challenger	Assistant
Phuket	Phatthalung	Lampang	Phichit	Khon Kaen	Surat Thani	Saraburi	Chumphon	Lamphun	Songkhla
BT฿3,203,683 (US$100,178)		BT฿2,012,513 (US$62,930)		BT฿1,071,068 (US$33,492)		BT฿582,332 (US$18,209)		BT฿292,972 (US$9,161)

Other positions
Top 10
- Bangkok – Kanaporn Phatthanaphan
- Chumphon – Suphannika Nopparat
- Phrae – Chutima Sodapak
- Roi Et – Kanchutikarn Peerthanatkul
- Songkhla – Suchita Oxman
Top 25
- Ang Thong – Chananda Pitichokwattana
- Chachoengsao – Kanlayawan Phet-in
- Chiang Mai – Wisansaya Pakasupakul
- Kalasin – Ilin Nabsuk
- Narathiwat – Ploynita Thanaveerakulwit
- Nong Khai – Chanyathida Matiyapak
- Nonthaburi – Parnrada Ratchataworaphat
- Phatthalung – Michelle Behrmann
- Phetchaburi – Pancharat Chaiyanboon
- Phitsanulok – Ornchada Chaiyasarn
- Prachinburi – Pornpimol Kulap
- Ratchaburi – Wikanda Kotkham
- Sing Buri – Pinyapat Khairawi
- Suphan Buri – Piyaporn Sangsuwan
- Udon Thani – Natthamanee Pitchayasuttisil

== Sub-contests ==
=== Grand Voice competition ===
Miss Grand Thailand 2025: Grand Voice contest Grand Voice ลูกทุ่งมหาชน
- Date: Audition: 5 March 2025; Finals: 25 March 2025
- Presenters: Sakul Limpapanon
- Venue: Audition: The Signature Hotel Airport, Hat Yai, Songkhla; Finals: MGI Hall, Bravo BKK Mall, Bangkok
- Broadcaster: YouTube
- Entrants: 77
- Placements: 30
- Winner: Kanlayawan Phet-in (CCO); Nattharin Bunnun (CPM); Orrapatsaya Suksai (CBI); Thipsuda Manmuang (PNB); Chutima Sodapak (PRE)

The Grand Voice competition was divided into two segments. All 77 contestants participated in the event, and 30 qualified for the second round where the number of qualifiers was then reduced to 12. These 12 finalists later competed in the final round held on 25 March at the MGI Hall, Bravo BKK Makk, in Bangkok, where the final 6 were elected; 3 by the judges and other 3 by public vote. The 3 winners were then revealed on the stage of the grand coronation night on 29 March.

The panel of judges for this sub-contest includes:

- Qualification round
  - Nawat Itsaragrisil — the pageant president
  - Engfa Waraha — Miss Grand Thailand 2022 and the pageant manager
  - Ajcharee Srisuk — 2023 Grand Voice winner and 3rd runner-up Miss Grand Thailand 2023
  - Kamonwarai Prajakrattanakul — Gen1es member and 5th runner-up Miss Grand Thailand 2023
  - Ble Patumrach — Thai Luk thung singer and songwriter.

Competition result:

Position	Contestants
Winners	Chachoengsao – Kanlayawan Phet-in; Chaiyaphum – Nattharin Bunnun; Chonburi – Orrapatsaya Suksai; Phetchabun – Thipsuda Manmuang; Phrae – Chutima Sodapak
Top 7	Phuket – Saranrat Puagpipat; Udon Thani – Natthamanee Pitchayasuttisil
Top 12	Chiang Rai – Sasi Nguyenwan; Lampang – Natthinee Thanatpornphinyo; Nong Bua Lamphu – Wanasanan Phengmanee; Sing Buri – Pinyapat Khairawi; Sisaket – Pitchapa Justice
Top 30	Bangkok – Kanaporn Phatthanaphan; Bueng Kan – Kanchanapa Thongya; Buriram – Chalinee Sinsawat; Kanchanaburi – Satiwan Kanbuppha; Khon Kaen – Chayathanus Saradatta; Loei – Arthitaya Jaithiang; Lopburi – Phattharanit Panchan; Maha Sarakham – Natnicha Si-thao; Nakhon Nayok – Napasorn Panpanich; Phatthalung – Michelle Behrmann; Phayao – Milin Pokinyinkom; Rayong – Nongnaphat Chenghuat; Samut Prakan – Jirapat Dathumma; Saraburi – Thitaree Phongtharasathorn; Satun – Benjawan Suchartpong; Tak – Jitsupa Thamrongchaipakorn; Ubon Ratchathani – Wanlapha Kanyama; Yala – Phatcharee Praha

=== Southern Thai Costume Contest ===
Southern Thai Costume Contest: The Civilization of Peninsula
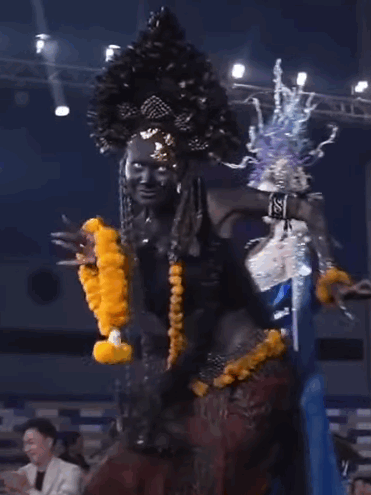
- The winning costume of Mae Yanang, as worn by Piyaporn Sangsuwan of Suphan Buri
- Date: 15 March 2025
- Presenters: Sakul Limpapanon
- Venue: The Signature Hotel Airport, Hat Yai, Songkhla
- Broadcaster: YouTube
- Entrants: 77
- Placements: 14
- Winner: Piyaporn Sangsuwan (Suphan Buri)

External videos
- Southern Thai Costume Contest: The Civilization of Peninsula, 15 March 2025

The Southern Thai Costume Contest: The Civilization of Peninsula (Thai: การประกวดชุดชาติพันธุ์ภาคใต้ คาบสมุทรมลายู) was organized at the Signature Hotel Airport in Hat Yai city, Songkhla province. All 77 provincial representatives competed in costumes that reflect the history, culture, beliefs, and way of life of the Thai people in the Malay Peninsula.

The contest was won by the representative of Suphan Buri province, Piyaporn Sangsuwan, who wore the Mae Yanang costume, which is a spirit guarding boats and various vehicles in several countries in Southeast Asia.

The panel of judges, including the pageant president Nawat Itsaragrisil, Miss Grand Songkhla's provincial director Araya To-kasub (อารยา โต๊กะสูบ), Miss Grand International 2024 Rachel Gupta, the 5th runner-up Miss Grand Thailand 2022 Charlotte Austin, Member of the House of Representatives, Songkhla Province Supaporn Kamnertphon, and several representatives of the pageant sponsors.

Competition result:

Legend:
J Qualified for the top 14 by the panel of judges
V Qualified for the top 14 by public vote

Position	Contestant	Prize
Winner	J Suphan Buri – Piyaporn Sangsuwan	BT฿50,000 (US$1,563) cash
1st runner-up	V Khon Kaen – Chayathanus Saradatta	BT฿20,000 cash
2nd runner-up	J Satun – Benjawan Suchartpong	BT฿10,000 cash
Top 5	J Krabi – Pantepthida Thammee; J Sa Kaeo – Bawonrat Maneerat	BT฿5,000 cash each
Top 14	V Chiang Mai – Wisansaya Pakasupakul; J Kalasin – Ilin Nabsuk; V Lamphun – Panichada Kongsawanya; V Phatthalung – Michelle Behrmann; V Phuket – Saranrat Puagpipat; J Ratchaburi – Wikanda Kotkham; V Songkhla – Suchita Oxman; J Surat Thani – Pawarisa Choosuk; V Udon Thani – Natthamanee Pitchayasuttisil	None

=== Swimsuit contest ===
Best in Swimsuit Contest
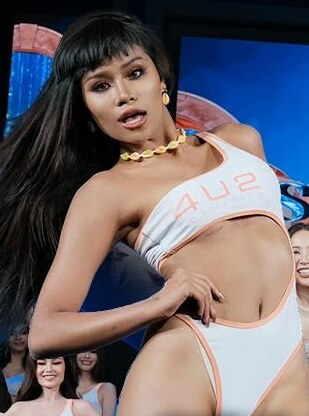
- Pawarisa Choosuk of Surat Thani, the winner of the Best Performance category.
- Date: 16 March 2025
- Presenters: Sakul Limpapanon; Kanyaphatsaphon Rungrueang
- Venue: The Signature Hotel Airport, Hat Yai, Songkhla
- Broadcaster: YouTube
- Entrants: 77
- Placements: 20
- Best in Swimsuit: Ilin Nabsuk (Kalasin)
- Best Performance: Pawarisa Choosuk (Surat Thani)

The competition for the Best in Swimsuit Award was organized on 16 March 2025 at the Signature Hotel Airport in Hat Yai city of Songkhla province. All 77 contestants competed. In addition to the primary title, the event also featured an ancillary prize for the most entertain staging, Best Performance, which was won by Surat Thani representative, Pawarisa Choosuk. Meanwhile, the winner of the main award, Ilin Nabsuk of Kalasin, was later announced in the grand final round on 29 March.

The event was hosted by the pageant personnel, Sakul Limpapanon, and the 1st runner-up Miss Grand Thailand 2024, Kanyaphatsaphon Rungrueang.

The panel of judges for this round includes:

- Nawat Itsaragrisil – the pageant president
- Araya To-kasub – Miss Grand Thailand's provincial director for Songkhla province
- Rachel Gupta – Miss Grand International 2024
- Charlotte Austin – 5th runner-up Miss Grand Thailand 2022
- Emma Martini – 5th runner-up Miss Grand Thailand 2024

Competition result:

Legend:
J Qualified for the top 20 by the panel of judges
V Qualified for the top 20 by public vote

Position	Contestant	Prize
Best in Swimsuit	V Kalasin – Ilin Nabsuk	BT฿100,000 (US$3,127) cash
Best Performance	J Surat Thani – Pawarisa Choosuk	BT฿30,000 (US$938) cash
Top 5	V Chumphon – Suphannika Nopparat; J Phatthalung – Michelle Behrmann; J Ratchaburi – Wikanda Kotkham; J Surat Thani – Pawarisa Choosuk	None
Top 20	V Bangkok – Kanaporn Phatthanaphan; J Khon Kaen – Chayathanus Saradatta; V Lampang – Natthinee Thanatpornphinyo; V Lamphun – Panichada Kongsawanya; J Nakhon Phanom – Cherlin Krai-arayapat; V Nakhon Sawan – Veerin Kaewpuk; V Nan – Mutita Champathin; J Phetchaburi – Pancharat Chaiyanboon; V Phitsanulok – Ornchada Chaiyasarn; V Phuket – Saranrat Puagpipat; V Saraburi – Thitaree Phongtharasathorn; J Sa Kaeo – Bawonrat Maneerat; J Sing Buri – Pinyapat Khairawi; J Songkhla – Suchita Oxman; V Udon Thani – Natthamanee Pitchayasuttisil	None

=== Miss Darling of Songkhla ===
Miss Darling of Songkhla มิสแกรนด์ขวัญใจสงขลา
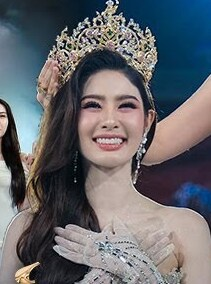
- Suphannika Nopparat of Chumphon, the winner of the sub-contest
- Date: 17 March 2025
- Presenters: Sakul Limpapanon; Kanyaphatsaphon Rungrueang
- Venue: The Signature Hotel Airport, Hat Yai, Songkhla
- Broadcaster: YouTube
- Entrants: 77
- Placements: 22
- Winner: Suphannika Nopparat (Chumphon)
- Miss People's Choice: Saranrat Puagpipat (Phuket)

External videos
- Miss Darling of Songkhla, 17 March 2025

Miss Darling of Songkhla or Miss Darling of the host city (Thai: มิสแกรนด์ขวัญใจสงขลา) is the finale contest in the host city of Songkhla. The contest was set for the Signature Hotel Airport, Hat Yai, on 17 March 2025.

The format of the competition is similar to the Miss Grand Thailand national Final, i.e., contestants introduce themselves in local costumes and then parade in evening gowns. Out of 77 contestants, only 22 made it to the next round, which was then narrowed down to 12 who moved on to the first Q&A round. The top 6 were then announced based on their answers, and a second Q&A round was used to determine the competition winner. The final question concerns the recent construction accident on Rama II Road, which has resulted in numerous deaths and injuries.

"For traveling by car from Bangkok to Songkhla Province, you have to go through Rama II Road, which is considered to have been under construction for more than 55 years, longer than the construction of the Egyptian pyramids. This has caused both loss of life and economic routes. What would you like to tell this government to solve this problem immediately?'

The winner, Suphannika Nopparat of Chumphon, replies:

"Of course, the loss in this catastrophe exceeds the collapse of the bridge. The human life cannot be restored. One thing I'd like to ask and tell this government is why they don't recognize the value of human life, the common people. Everyone pays the taxes, thus they should have the same standard of life. As previously stated, the construction structure may not necessarily be the result of engineering faults. Everyone! It stems from deep-seated corruption from the start. If we are unable to resolve the issue at its source at this time. So, let's try to solve the challenge in the conclusion. If the construction is strictly inspected, there is no neglect, and the budget is used for other purposes, we will most likely have a solid bridge that will keep people safe. Thank you."

The event was hosted by the pageant personnel, Sakul Limpapanon, and the 1st runner-up Miss Grand Thailand 2024, Kanyaphatsaphon Rungrueang.

The competition results are shown below.

Position	Contestants	Prize
Winner	Chumphon – Suphannika Nopparat (Note: Automatically qualified for the top 12 after winning the sponsor fast-track)	BT฿100,000 (US$3,127)
1st runner-up	Khon Kaen – Chayathanus Saradatta (Note: Automatically qualified for the top 22 after winning the Miss Popularlity)	BT฿50,000 (US$1,563)
2nd runner-up	Lampang – Natthinee Thanatpornphinyo	BT฿30,000 (US$938)
3rd runner-up	Songkhla – Suchita Oxman	BT฿10,000 (US$313) each
4th runner-up	Phatthalung – Michelle Behrmann; Phuket – Saranrat Puagpipat (Note: Automatically qualified for the top 6 after winning the Miss People's Choice)	BT฿10,000 (US$313) each
Top 12	Chachoengsao – Kanlayawan Phet-in; Kalasin – Ilin Nabsuk; Lamphun – Panichada Kongsawanya; Phetchaburi – Pancharat Chaiyanboon; Surat Thani – Pawarisa Choosuk; Udon Thani – Natthamanee Pitchayasuttisil	None
Top 22	Bangkok – Kanaporn Phatthanaphan; Chiang Mai – Wisansaya Pakasupakul; Chonburi – Orrapatsaya Suksai; Nakhon Phanom – Cherlin Krai-arayapat; Nakhon Sawan – Veerin Kaewpuk; Nakhon Si Thammarat – Aphassara Duangsai; Pathum Thani – Aitsari Rodwised; Phrae – Chutima Sodapak; Saraburi – Thitaree Phongtharasathorn; Suphan Buri – Piyaporn Sangsuwan	None
Special awards
Miss People's Choice	Phuket – Saranrat Puagpipat	BT฿20,000 (US$625)
Miss Popularity	Khon Kaen – Chayathanus Saradatta; Lampang – Natthinee Thanatpornphinyo; Lamphun – Panichada Kongsawanya; Phetchaburi – Pancharat Chaiyanboon; Phuket – Saranrat Puagpipat	None
Miss Miraa	Phuket – Saranrat Puagpipat	BT฿10,000 (US$313)
Miss Darling of Songkhla H.R.	Chumphon – Suphannika Nopparat	None
Miss Good Skin	Phatthalung – Michelle Behrmann	BT฿20,000 (US$625)
Miss Miracle	Udon Thani – Natthamanee Pitchayasuttisil	BT฿10,000 (US$313)

=== National Costume contest ===
Miss Grand Thailand 2025: National Costume Contest
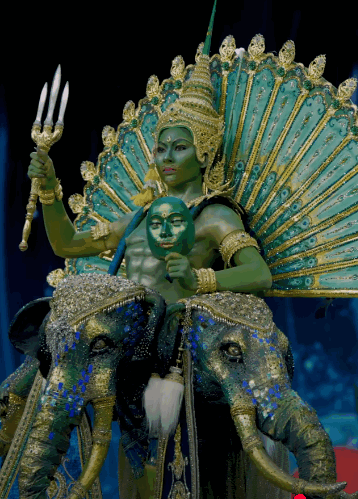
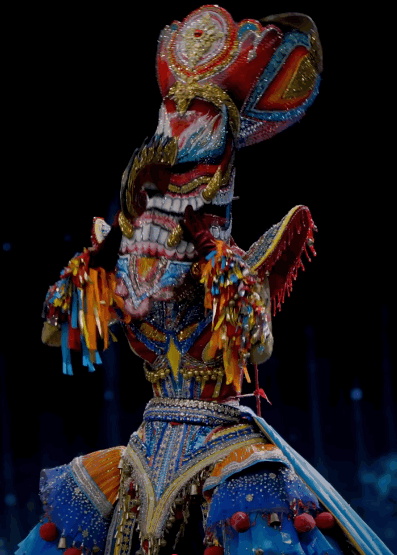
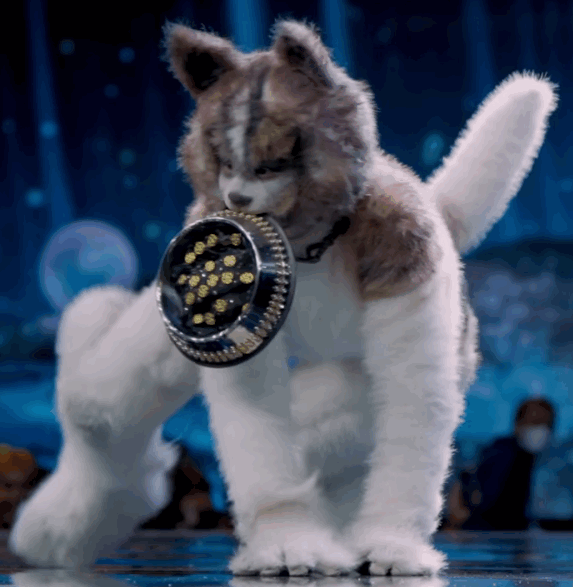
- Winning costumes: (Top left) Indra on Airavata costume of Samut Prakan province, (Top right) Phi Ta Khon costume of Loei province, and (Bottom) Thai Bangkaew Dog costume of Phitsanulok province.
- Date: 24 March 2025
- Presenters: Sakul Limpapanon
- Venue: MGI Hall, Bravo BKK Mall, Bangkok
- Broadcaster: YouTube
- Entrants: 77
- Placements: 30
- Winner: Arthitaya Jaithiang (LEI); Ornchada Chaiyasarn (PLK); Jirapat Dathumma (SPK)

External videos
- National Costume contest, 24 March 2025

The national costume contest for this year's edition was held on 24 March 2025 at the MGI Hall, Bravo BKK Mall, Bangkok, and was live transmitted to the audience worldwide through an MGI YouTube channel named GrandTV. All 77 provincial representatives paraded in costumes that reflected the history, culture, beliefs, and way of life of the people in their respective provinces. Five of the top 30 qualified costumes were selected through an onsite public vote conducted in the event, 15 of the remaining spots will be chosen by the panel of judges, and the other 10 by the online vote on Facebook and Instagram. Three winning costumes and 12 runners-up were announced on the grand coronation night on 29 March.

Some qualified costumes were chosen as the national costumes worn by Miss Grand Thailand representatives competing at the 2025 international pageants.

Competition result:

Legend:
J Qualified for the top 30 by the panel of judges
S Qualified for the top 30 by onsite vote
V Qualified for the top 30 by online vote

Placement	Contestants
Winners	J Loei – Arthitaya Jaithiang; V Phitsanulok – Ornchada Chaiyasarn; J Samut Prakan – Jirapat Dathumma
Runners-up	V Kalasin – Ilin Nabsuk; S Khon Kaen – Chayathanus Saradatta; J Krabi – Pantepthida Thammee; J Mae Hong Son – Manatsavee Tangplub; J Pathum Thani – Aitsari Rodwised; J Phayao – Milin Pokinyinkom; V Phichit – Pitchapa Saeng-aram; J Sisaket – Pitchapa Justice; V Songkhla – Suchita Oxman; J Suphan Buri – Piyaporn Sangsuwan; J Surin – Rinlita Thanasathianthaweekit; V Udon Thani – Natthamanee Pitchayasuttisil
Top 30	S Bangkok – Kanaporn Phatthanaphan; V Bueng Kan – Kanchanapa Thongya; J Chiang Rai – Sasi Nguyenwan; V Chumphon – Suphannika Nopparat; V Lampang – Natthinee Thanatpornphinyo; S Lamphun – Panichada Kongsawanya; J Nakhon Pathom – Wijittra Aneak; J Nakhon Ratchasima – Sirisopha Chaipuriwong; V Phatthalung – Michelle Behrmann; S Phrae – Chutima Sodapak; J Phra Nakhon Si Ayutthaya – Thanchanok Keawpatcha; S Phuket – Saranrat Puagpipat; V Saraburi – Thitaree Phongtharasathorn; J Sing Buri – Pinyapat Khairawi; J Yala – Phatcharee Praha

== Finals ==
Theme logo

Since obtaining their provincial crowns, each candidate has been evaluated and scored. This score, together with the points earned throughout the national pageant camp, will decide the top 20 finalists who will be revealed in the grand final round, to be held on 29 March 2025, at the MGI Hall, Bravo BKK Mall in Bangkok.

As done in the previous edition, the top 20 finalists, 5 from each of the 4 regional groups, competed in the swimsuit section. Afterward, two candidates from each group, including the Miss Popular Vote winner determined through public voting, the Best Seller Award winner, and the Boss Choice fast-track winner directly selected by the pageant's president, completed the top 11 finalists who then enter the evening gown and speech competitions.

After the evening gown and speech sessions, regional group winners, together with the Boss Choice winner, were elected as the top 5 to compete in the question-and-answer portion, where the pageant's winner and all four runners-up were decided.

The summary of the selection process is presented below.

Miss Grand Thailand 2025 selection process

Top 20	Top 11	Top 5	Finals
Boss Choice; 1 candidate	Boss Choice; 1 candidate
Custom Selection; 5 candidates/group	Swimsuit round	Custom selection 2 candidates/group	Evening gown and Speech rounds	Custom selection 1 candidate/group	Question and answer round	Winner; Announcement
Miss Popular Vote; 1 candidate
Best Seller Award; 1 candidate

== Contestants ==
Contestants from 77 provinces competed for the title.

Code	Province	Candidate	Age (Note: Ages at the time of the pageant)	Height	Group	Ref
MGT01	Bangkok	Kanaporn Phatthanaphan	24	1.72 m (5 ft 7 1/2 in)	Central	
MGT02	(Krabi province) Krabi	Pantepthida Thammee	19	1.65 m (5 ft 5 in)	Southern	
MGT03	(Kanchanaburi province) Kanchanaburi	Satiwan Kanbuppha	25	1.67 m (5 ft 5 1/2 in)	Southern	
MGT04	(Kalasin province) Kalasin	Ilin Nabsuk	22	1.74 m (5 ft 8 1/2 in)	Northeastern	
MGT05	(Kamphaeng Phet province) Kamphaeng Phet	Supisara Wattanakijpaisan	18	1.74 m (5 ft 8 1/2 in)	Northern	
MGT06	(Khon Kaen province) Khon Kaen	Chayathanus Saradatta	30	1.80 m (5 ft 11 in)	Northeastern	
MGT07	Chanthaburi	Natthamon Kaenkrathok	28	1.70 m (5 ft 7 in)	Central	
MGT08	Chachoengsao	Kanlayawan Phet-in	23	1.71 m (5 ft 7 1/2 in)	Central	
MGT09	Chonburi	Alraphatsaya Suksai	29	1.68 m (5 ft 6 in)	Central	
MGT10	(Chai Nat province) Chai Nat	Thawinan Youngyuen	22	1.67 m (5 ft 5 1/2 in)	Central	
MGT11	Chaiyaphum	Nattharin Bunnun	24	1.68 m (5 ft 6 in)	Northeastern	
MGT12	Chumphon	Suphannika Nopparat	27	1.72 m (5 ft 7 1/2 in)	Southern	
MGT13	Chiang Rai	Sasi Ngiunwan	24	1.65 m (5 ft 5 in)	Northern	
MGT14	Chiang Mai	Wisansaya Pakasupakul	31	1.68 m (5 ft 6 in)	Northern	
MGT15	Trang	Kirana Sathongklang (Note: Originally the 1st runner-up Miss Grand Trang 2025, but was later appointed as the replacement for the original winner, Ploypapat Simathammarak (พลอยปภัส สีมาธรรมะรักษ์), who was dethroned by the provincial director.)	18	1.72 m (5 ft 7 1/2 in)	Southern	
MGT16	Trat	Sopida Bussarakham	24	1.70 m (5 ft 7 in)	Northeastern	
MGT17	Tak	Jitsupa Thamrongchaipakorn	26	1.68 m (5 ft 6 in)	Northern	
MGT18	Nakhon Nayok	Napasorn Panpanich	24	1.68 m (5 ft 6 in)	Central	
MGT19	Nakhon Pathom	Wijittra Anek	26	1.76 m (5 ft 9 1/2 in)	Central	
MGT20	Nakhon Phanom	Cherlin Krai-arayaphat	23	1.71 m (5 ft 7 1/2 in)	Northeastern	
MGT21	Nakhon Ratchasima	Sirisopha Chaipuriwong	24	1.75 m (5 ft 9 in)	Northeastern	
MGT22	Nakhon Si Thammarat	Aphassara Duangsai	29	1.70 m (5 ft 7 in)	Southern	
MGT23	Nakhon Sawan	Veerin Kaewpuk	29	1.67 m (5 ft 5 1/2 in)	Northern	
MGT24	Nonthaburi	Parnrada Ratchataworaphat	28	1.67 m (5 ft 5 1/2 in)	Central	
MGT25	Narathiwat	Ploynita Thanaveerakulwit	29	1.69 m (5 ft 6 1/2 in)	Southern	
MGT26	Nan	Mutita Champathin	21	1.67 m (5 ft 5 1/2 in)	Northern	
MGT27	Bueng Kan	Kanchanapa Thongya	27	1.67 m (5 ft 5 1/2 in)	Northeastern	
MGT28	Buriram	Chalinee Sinsawat	20	1.67 m (5 ft 5 1/2 in)	Northeastern	
MGT29	Pathum Thani	Aitsari Rodwised	26	1.76 m (5 ft 9 1/2 in)	Central	
MGT30	Prachuap Khiri Khan	Suthida Tjärnås	28	1.73 m (5 ft 8 in)	Southern	
MGT31	Prachinburi	Pornpimol Kulab	25	1.70 m (5 ft 7 in)	Central	
MGT32	Pattani	Ikkyu Sornbal	22	1.60 m (5 ft 3 in)	Southern	
MGT33	Phra Nakhon Si Ayutthaya	Thanchanok Keawpatcha	26	1.71 m (5 ft 7 1/2 in)	Central	
MGT34	Phayao	Milin Pokinyinkom	28	1.67 m (5 ft 5 1/2 in)	Northern	
MGT35	Phang Nga	Piyanuch Yimsara	29	1.67 m (5 ft 5 1/2 in)	Southern	
MGT36	Phatthalung	Michelle Behrmann	30	1.70 m (5 ft 7 in)	Southern	
MGT37	Phichit	Pitchapa Saeng-aram	26	1.70 m (5 ft 7 in)	Northern	
MGT38	Phitsanulok	Ornchada Chaiyasarn	26	1.71 m (5 ft 7 1/2 in)	Northern	
MGT39	Phetchaburi	Pancharat Chaiyanboon	18	1.75 m (5 ft 9 in)	Southern	
MGT40	Phetchabun	Thipsuda Manmuang	20	1.67 m (5 ft 5 1/2 in)	Northern	
MGT41	Phrae	Chutima Sodapak	25	1.63 m (5 ft 4 in)	Northern	
MGT42	Phuket	Saranrat Puagpipat	28	1.70 m (5 ft 7 in)	Southern	
MGT43	Maha Sarakham	Natnicha Si-thao	20	1.74 m (5 ft 8 1/2 in)	Northeastern	
MGT44	Mukdahan	Nathrika Sthapornnawakun	27	1.67 m (5 ft 5 1/2 in)	Northeastern	
MGT45	Mae Hong Son	Manatsavee Tangplub	17	1.68 m (5 ft 6 in)	Northern	
MGT46	Yala	Phatcharee Praha	25	1.70 m (5 ft 7 in)	Southern	
MGT47	Yasothon	Melinyan Pronsinchaunan	25	1.70 m (5 ft 7 in)	Northeastern	
MGT48	Roi Et	Kanchutikarn Peerthanatkul	25	1.65 m (5 ft 5 in)	Northeastern	
MGT49	Ranong	Kittiyaphon Buason	25	1.70 m (5 ft 7 in)	Southern	
MGT50	Rayong	Nongnaphat Chenghuat	19	1.65 m (5 ft 5 in)	Central	
MGT51	Ratchaburi	Wikanda Kotkam (Note: Originally the 1st runner-up Miss Grand Ratchaburi 2025, but was later appointed as the replacement for the original winner, Thanyaphak Patcharaphirom (ธัณญภัคส์ พัชรภิย์รมณ์), who was dethroned by the provincial director.)	27	1.80 m (5 ft 11 in)	Southern	
MGT52	Lopburi	Phattharanit Panchan	23	1.69 m (5 ft 6 1/2 in)	Central	
MGT53	Lampang	Nartthinee Tanutaponpinyo	20	1.70 m (5 ft 7 in)	Northern	
MGT54	Lamphun	Panichada Kongsawanya	23	1.73 m (5 ft 8 in)	Northern	
MGT55	Loei	Arthitaya Jaithiang	20	1.69 m (5 ft 6 1/2 in)	Northeastern	
MGT56	Sisaket	Pitchapa Justice	21	1.75 m (5 ft 9 in)	Northeastern	
MGT57	Sakon Nakhon	Kalyanat Prasomsri	30	1.72 m (5 ft 7 1/2 in)	Northeastern	
MGT58	Songkhla	Suchita Oxman	24	1.70 m (5 ft 7 in)	Southern	
MGT59	Satun	Benjawan Suchartpong	28	1.65 m (5 ft 5 in)	Southern	
MGT60	Samut Prakan	Jirapat Dathumma	21	1.72 m (5 ft 7 1/2 in)	Central	
MGT61	Samut Songkhram	Panicha Pratipwisarut	20	1.67 m (5 ft 5 1/2 in)	Central	
MGT62	Samut Sakhon	Pimolkan Khantinarong	28	1.75 m (5 ft 9 in)	Central	
MGT63	Sa Kaeo	Bowonrat Maneerat	28	1.62 m (5 ft 4 in)	Central	
MGT64	Saraburi	Thitaree Pongtonsaton	21	1.65 m (5 ft 5 in)	Central	
MGT65	Sing Buri	Pinyapat Khairawi (Note: Originally the 1st runner-up Miss Grand Sing Buri 2025, but was later appointed as the replacement for the original winner, Panthita Saengchan (ปัณฑิตา แสงจันทร์), who resigned.)	26	1.65 m (5 ft 5 in)	Central	
MGT66	Sukhothai	Lalitchat Ponchaleechai (Note: Originally crowned the first runner-up Miss Grand Sukhothai 2025 but was promoted to the title after the original winner, Chanakan Kaewsri, resigned.)	27	1.68 m (5 ft 6 in)	Northern	
MGT67	Suphan Buri	Piyaporn Sangsuwan	26	1.72 m (5 ft 7 1/2 in)	Central	
MGT68	Surat Thani	Pawarisa Choosuk	18	1.75 m (5 ft 9 in)	Southern	
MGT69	Surin	Rinlita Thanasathianthaweekit	24	1.67 m (5 ft 5 1/2 in)	Northeastern	
MGT70	Nong Khai	Chanyathida Matiyapak	30	1.68 m (5 ft 6 in)	Northeastern	
MGT71	Nong Bua Lamphu	Wanasanan Phengmanee	26	1.65 m (5 ft 5 in)	Northeastern	
MGT72	Ang Thong	Chananda Pitichokwattana	28	1.71 m (5 ft 7 1/2 in)	Central	
MGT73	Udon Thani	Natthamanee Pitchayasuttisil	24	1.72 m (5 ft 7 1/2 in)	Northeastern	
MGT74	Uthai Thani	Nattakul Samutnoi	24	1.70 m (5 ft 7 in)	Northern	
MGT75	Uttaradit	Abhinya Phiamdee (Note: The original winner, Ampika Butdawong, resigned, the 2nd runner-up, Abhinya Phiamdee, was then promoted to the title.)	27	1.62 m (5 ft 4 in)	Northern	
MGT76	Ubon Ratchathani	Wanlapha Kanyama	19	1.67 m (5 ft 5 1/2 in)	Northeastern	
MGT77	Amnat Charoen	Nattaniya Suppakingul	28	1.68 m (5 ft 6 in)	Northeastern	
