= Miss Grand Chachoengsao =

Provincial pageant in Chachoengsao, Thailand

Miss Grand Chachoengsao มิสแกรนด์ฉะเชิงเทรา
- Formation: March 16, 2017; 9 years ago
- Founder: Thitaphat Khuirakkhit
- Type: Beauty pageant
- Headquarters: Chachoengsao
- Location: Thailand
- Official language: Thai
- Director: Thitaphat Khuirakkhit (2017–present)
- Affiliations: Miss Grand Thailand

Summary result of Chachoengsao representatives at Miss Grand Thailand
| Placement | Number(s) |
|---|---|
| Winner | 0 |
| 1st runner-up | 0 |
| 2nd runner-up | 0 |
| 3rd runner-up | 0 |
| 4th runner-up | 0 |
| Top 10/11/12 | 1 |
| Top 20/21 | 1 |
| Unplaced | 6 |

Miss Grand Chachoengsao (Thai: มิสแกรนด์ฉะเชิงเทรา) is a Thai provincial beauty pageant which selects a representative from Chachoengsao province to the Miss Grand Thailand national competition. It was founded in 2017 by a local event organizer, Thitaphat Khuirakkhit (ฐิตาภัทร์ ขุยรักขิต).

Chachoengsao representatives have yet to win the Miss Grand Thailand title. The highest placement they obtained in the contest was in the top 12 finalists, achieved in 2018 by Anna Chalida Corvino. The remaining two representatives were placed in the top 20 twice, by Rungtawan Nanthasirikul of 2019 and Kanlayawan Phet-in of 2025.

== History ==
In 2016, after Miss Grand Thailand began franchising the provincial competitions to individual organizers, who would name seventy-seven provincial titleholders to compete in the national pageant. The license for Chachoengsao province was granted to a media company led by Praphan Rayayoi (ประพันธ์ ระยาย้อย), who appointed a French-Thai model from Udon Thani to represent Chachoengsao at the 2016 national stage. The license was then transferred to another organizer team led by Thitaphat Khuirakkhit the following year.

Under the directorship of the new team, the first Miss Grand Chachoengsao contest, which consisted of 11 finalists, was organized on March 16, 2017, in Mueang Chachoengsao, where a communication arts student from Bangkok University, Chonlakon Duangploy, was named the winner.

The pageant was skipped in 2021, due to the COVID-19 pandemic in Thailand, the national organizer was unable to organize the national event, and the country representative for the international tournament was appointed instead.

Winner gallery

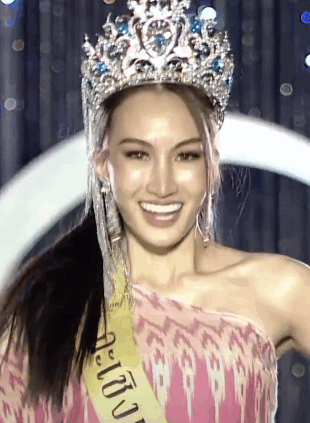
Ratchaya Mingboon,
Miss Grand Chachoengsao 2022

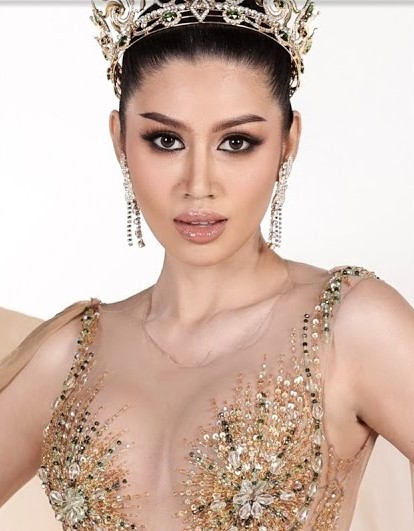
Pahcharin Malilor,
Miss Grand Chachoengsao 2023

== Editions ==
The following table details Miss Grand Chachoengsao's annual editions since 2017.

| Edition | Date | Final venue | Entrants | Winner | Ref. |
|---|---|---|---|---|---|
| 1st | March 16, 2017 | Suntara Wellness Resort & Hotel, Mueang Chachoengsao, Chachoengsao | 11 | Chonlakon Duangploy | |
| 2nd | May 11, 2018 | Suntara Wellness Resort & Hotel, Mueang Chachoengsao, Chachoengsao | 10 | Anna Chalida Corvino | |
| 3rd | May 22, 2019 | Suntara Wellness Resort & Hotel, Mueang Chachoengsao, Chachoengsao | 13 | Rungtawan Nanthasirikul | |
| 4th | June 28, 2020 | Suntara Wellness Resort & Hotel, Mueang Chachoengsao, Chachoengsao | 11 | Phanthira Tippayanon | |
| 5th | November 14, 2021 | Suntara Wellness Resort & Hotel, Mueang Chachoengsao, Chachoengsao | 10 | Ratchaya Mingbun | |
| 6th | February 5, 2023 | Suntara Wellness Resort & Hotel, Mueang Chachoengsao, Chachoengsao | 15 | Patcharin Malilor | |
| 7th | December 16, 2023 | Suntara Wellness Resort & Hotel, Mueang Chachoengsao, Chachoengsao | 14 | Kavinta Phrommat | |
| 8th | December 1, 2024 | Suntara Wellness Resort & Hotel, Mueang Chachoengsao, Chachoengsao | 12 | Kanlayawan Phet-in | |

== National competition ==
The following is a list of Chachoengsao representatives who competed at the Miss Grand Thailand pageant.

| Year | Representative | | Original provincial title | Placement at Miss Grand Thailand | Provincial director | Ref. |
| Year | Romanized name | Thai name | Original provincial title | Placement at Miss Grand Thailand | Provincial director | Ref. |
|---|---|---|---|---|---|---|
| 2016 | Elisabeth Moszkowicz | อลิซาเบธ มอสโควิทซ์ | Miss Grand Chachoengsao 2016 | Unplaced | Praphan Rayayoi | |
| 2017 | Chonlakon Duangploy | ชลกร ดวงพลอย | Miss Grand Chachoengsao 2017 | Unplaced | Thitaphat Khuirakkhit | |
| 2018 | Anna Chalida Corvino | แอนนา ชลิดา คอร์วีโน | Miss Grand Chachoengsao 2018 | Top 12 | Thitaphat Khuirakkhit | |
| 2019 | Rungtawan Nanthasirikul | รุ้งตะวัน นันทสิริกุล | Miss Grand Chachoengsao 2019 | Top 20 | Thitaphat Khuirakkhit | |
| 2020 | Phanthira Tippayanon | ภัณฑิรา ทิพยนนท์ | Miss Grand Chachoengsao 2020 | Unplaced | Thitaphat Khuirakkhit | |
| 2021 | No national pageant due to the COVID-19 pandemic. | | | | | |
| 2022 | Ratchaya Mingbun | รัชญา มิ่งบุญ | Miss Grand Chachoengsao 2021/22 | Unplaced | Thitaphat Khuirakkhit | |
| 2023 | Patcharin Malilor | พัชรินทร์ มะลิเลาะ | Miss Grand Chachoengsao 2023 | Unplaced | Thitaphat Khuirakkhit | |
| 2024 | Kavinta Phrommat | กวินตา พรหมมาตร์ | Miss Grand Chachoengsao 2024 | Unplaced | Thitaphat Khuirakkhit | |
| 2025 | Kanlayawan Phet-in | กัลยาวรรณ เพ็ชร์อินทร์ | Miss Grand Chachoengsao 2025 | Top 20 | Thitaphat Khuirakkhit | |
| 2026 | Phatcharamon Thepraksa | พัชรมนต์ เทพรักษา | Miss Grand Chachoengsao 2026 | 5th Runners-Up | | |
