= Miss Grand Chaiyaphum =

Provincial pageant in Chaiyaphum, Thailand

Miss Grand Chaiyaphum มิสแกรนด์ชัยภูมิ
- Formation: April 9, 2016; 10 years ago
- Founder: Chotiwat Diloklap
- Type: Beauty pageant
- Headquarters: Chaiyaphum
- Location: Thailand
- Official language: Thai
- Directors: Chotiwat Diloklap and Abhisit Sirirat (2022–present)
- Affiliations: Miss Grand Thailand

Summary result of Chaiyaphum representatives at Miss Grand Thailand
Placement	Number(s)
Winner	0
1st runner-up	0
2nd runner-up	0
3rd runner-up	0
4th runner-up	0
Top 10/11/12	2
Top 20/21	1
Unplaced	5

Miss Grand Chaiyaphum (Thai: มิสแกรนด์ชัยภูมิ) is a Thai provincial beauty pageant, which selects a representative from Chaiyaphum province to the Miss Grand Thailand national competition. It was founded in 2016 by an entrepreneur, Chotiwat Diloklap (โชติวัฒน์ ดิลกลาภ).

Chaiyaphum representatives have yet to win the Miss Grand Thailand title. The highest placement they obtained was in the semi-finalists (top 10/12), achieved in 2016 and 2018.

== History ==
In 2016, after Miss Grand Thailand began franchising the provincial competitions to individual organizers, who would name seventy-seven provincial titleholders to compete in the national pageant. The license for Chaiyaphum province was granted to an event organizer, Chotiwat Diloklap, who organized the first Miss Grand Chaiyaphum contest in that year on 9 April and named a model from Khon Kaen, Korrawan Lodsanthia, the winner.

The pageant was skipped once; in 2021, due to the COVID-19 pandemic in Thailand, the national organizer was unable to organize the national event, and the country representative for the international tournament was appointed instead.

Winner gallery

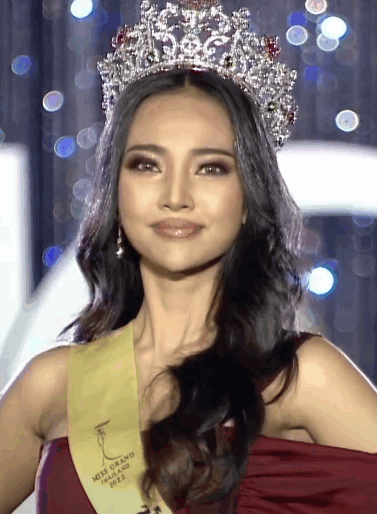
Orakanya Pong-amphai,
Miss Grand Chaiyaphum 2021/22

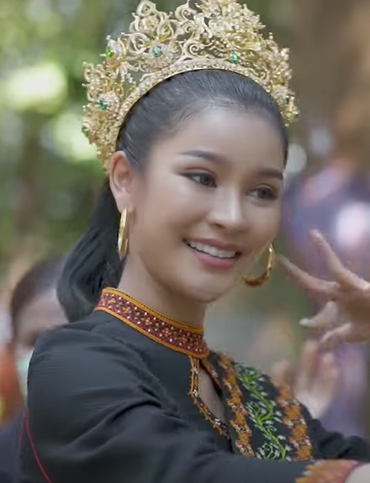
Kittiyaporn Lanon,
Miss Grand Chaiyaphum 2024

== Editions ==
The following table details Miss Grand Chaiyaphum's annual editions since 2016.

Edition	Date	Final venue	Entrants	Winner	Ref.
1st	9 April 2016	So-Jeng Restaurant, Mueang, Chaiyaphum	7	Korrawan Lodsanthia	
2nd	29 April 2017	Chaiyaphum Rajabhat University Grand Auditorium, Mueang, Chaiyaphum	15	Areerat Boonchoo	
3rd	19 May 2018	Puangkasem Country Resort, Mueang, Chaiyaphum	7	Thanawan Kaewsri	
4th	27 April 2019	Robinson Lifestyle, Mueang, Chaiyaphum	12	Sudawan Kumdee	
5th	15 August 2020	Robinson Lifestyle, Mueang, Chaiyaphum	12	Charinee Khutpho	
6th	20 February 2022	Chaiyaphum Park Hotel, Mueang, Chaiyaphum	16	Orakanya Phong-ampai	
7th	29 January 2023	Charoen Auto Group Building, Ford Chaiyaphum Center, Mueang, Chaiyaphum	8	Sirirat Manikha	
8th	12 November 2023	Chaiyaphum Park Hotel, Mueang, Chaiyaphum	14	Krittiyaporn Lanon	
9th	3 November 2024	Siam River Resort, Mueang, Chaiyaphum	11	Nattharin Bunnun	

== National competition ==
The following is a list of Chaiyaphum representatives who competed at the Miss Grand Thailand pageant.

Year	Representative		Original provincial title	Placement at Miss Grand Thailand	Provincial director	Ref.
Year	Romanized name	Thai name	Original provincial title	Placement at Miss Grand Thailand	Provincial director	Ref.
2016	Korrawan Lodsanthia	กรวรรณ หลอดสันเทียะ	Miss Grand Chaiyaphum 2016	Top 10	Chotiwat Diloklap	
2017	Areerat Boonchoo	อารีรัตน์ บุญชู	Miss Grand Chaiyaphum 2017	Unplaced	Chotiwat Diloklap	
2018	Thanawan Kaewsri	ธนวรรณ แก้วศรี	Miss Grand Chaiyaphum 2018	Top 12	Chotiwat Diloklap	
2019	Sudawan Khamdee	สุดาวัลย์ คำดี	Miss Grand Chaiyaphum 2019	Unplaced	Chotiwat Diloklap	
2020	Charinee Khutpho	ชาริณีย์ ขุดโพธิ์	Miss Grand Chaiyaphum 2020	Top 20	Chotiwat Diloklap	
2021	No national pageant due to the COVID-19 pandemic.					
2022	Orakanya Phong-ampai	อรกัญญา ผ่องอำไพ	Miss Grand Chaiyaphum 2021/22	Unplaced	Chotiwat Diloklap and Abhisit Sirirat	
2023	Sirirat Manikha	ศิริรัตน์ มณีคะ	Miss Grand Chaiyaphum 2023	Unplaced	Chotiwat Diloklap and Abhisit Sirirat	
2024	Krittiyaporn Lanon	กฤติยาภรณ์ ลานนท์	Miss Grand Chaiyaphum 2024	Unplaced	Chotiwat Diloklap and Abhisit Sirirat	
2025	Nattharin Bunnun	ณัฐรินทร์ บุญหนุน	Miss Grand Chaiyaphum 2025	Unplaced	Kritsana Mueankanya	
2026					Chonticha Kunsuwan	
