= Miss Grand Chiang Mai =

Provincial pageant in Thailand

Miss Grand Chiang Mai มิสแกรนด์เชียงใหม่
- Formation: March 27, 2016; 10 years ago
- Founder: Adisorn Suddee
- Type: Beauty pageant
- Headquarters: Chiang Mai
- Location: Thailand
- Members: Miss Grand Thailand
- Official language: Thai
- Provincial Director: Chalermchon Wongchomphu; Atthaphan Ya-sa-nga

Summary result of Chiang Mai representatives at Miss Grand Thailand
Placement	Number(s)
Winner	0
1st runner-up	0
2nd runner-up	1
3rd runner-up	0
4th runner-up	0
Top 10/12	1
Top 20	2

Miss Grand Chiang Mai (Thai: มิสแกรนด์เชียงใหม่) is a Thai provincial beauty pageant which selects a representative from Chiang Mai province for the Miss Grand Thailand national competition, founded in 2016 by an event organizer, Adisorn Suddee (อดิศร สุดดี), who was also the president of Chiang Mai-based international male pageant, Mister Global.

Since the first competition in the Miss Grand Thailand pageant in 2016, Chiang Mai's representatives have never won the main title but was placed the second runner-up once; in 2019, by Narumon Khampan.

== History ==
In 2016, after Miss Grand Thailand began franchising the provincial competitions to individual organizers, who would name seventy-seven provincial titleholders to compete in the national pageant, the license for Bangkok was purchased by a local entrepreneur, Adisorn Suddee (อดิศร สุดดี), who was also the organizer of the traditional pageant of Miss Chiang Mai and an international male pageant, Mister Global. Suddee relinquished the franchise to another local organizer Aongkan Chai-aongkan (โองการ ไชยองค์การ) in 2018.

The first Miss Grand Chiang Mai competition was organized on 26 March 2016, in which a 4th-year management student from the Rajamangala University of Technology Lanna, Sasiwimon Mongkolkawin, was elected as the first Miss Grand Chiang Mai titleholder.

The pageant was skipped once; in 2021, due to the COVID-19 pandemic in Thailand, the national organizer was unable to organize the national event, and the country representative for the international tournament was appointed instead.

Winner gallery

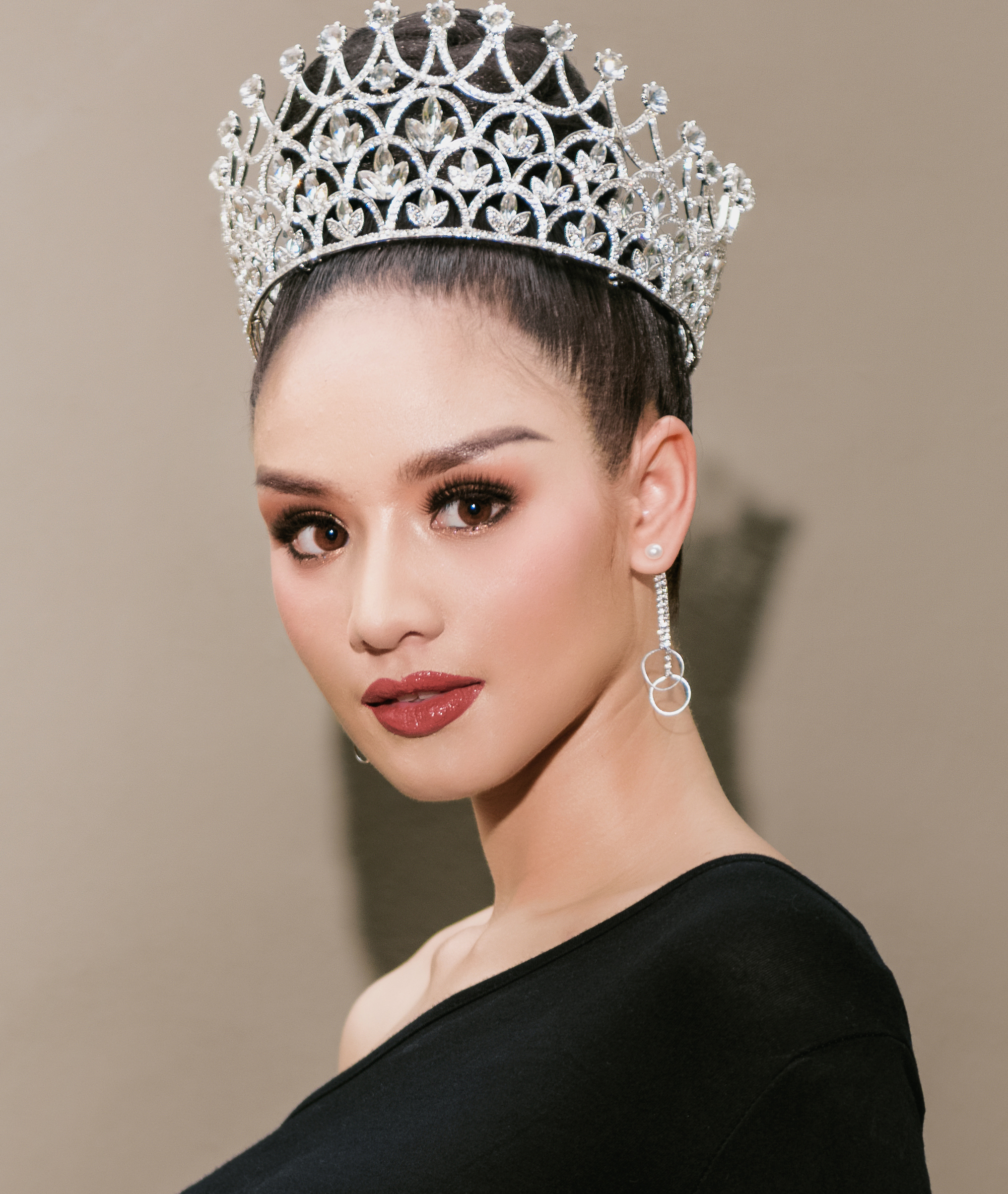
Orachada Chaiyasan
Miss Grand Chiang Mai 2018

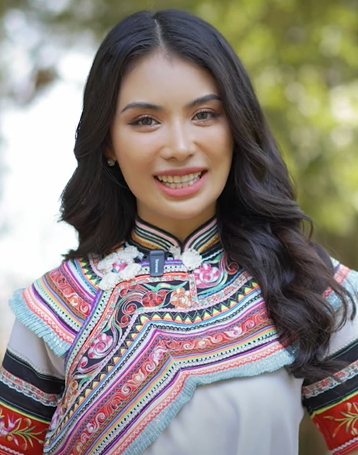
Atita Payak
Miss Grand Chiang Mai 2022

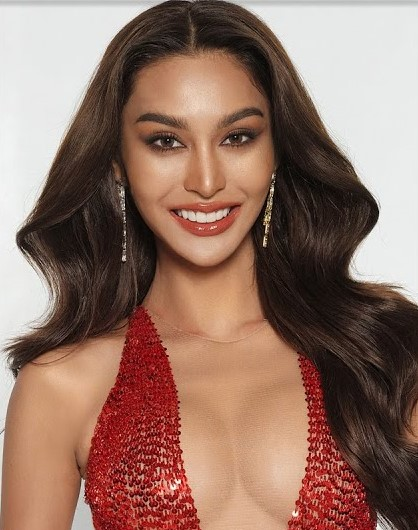
Sisawan Sukhiwat
Miss Grand Chiang Mai 2023

== Editions ==
The following table details Miss Grand Chiang Mai's annual editions since 2016.

Edition	Date	Final venue	Entrants	Winner	Ref.
1st	27 March 2016	CentralFestival Chiangmai, Chiang Mai	12	Sasiwimon Mongkolkawin	
2nd	30 April 2017	CentralFestival Chiangmai, Chiang Mai	12	Thanaporn Phothatip	
3rd	31 March 2018	CentralFestival Chiangmai, Chiang Mai	26	Orachada Chaiyasan	
4th	25 April 2019	Chiangmai Grandview Convention Center, Mueang Chiang Mai	20	Narumon Khampan	
5th	14 August 2020	Central Chiang Mai Airport, Mueang Chiang Mai	11	Panida Khueanjinda	
6th	23 December 2021	Central Chiang Mai Airport, Mueang Chiang Mai	18	Athita Payak	
7th	17 November 2022	Central Chiang Mai Airport, Mueang Chiang Mai	20	Sisawan Sukhiwat	
8th	24 December 2023	Central Chiang Mai Airport, Mueang Chiang Mai	15	Pornsupphat Pratumwan	
9th				Wisansaya Pakasupakul	

== National competition ==
The following is a list of Chiang Mai representatives who competed at the Miss Grand Thailand pageant.

Year	Representative		Original provincial title	Placement at Miss Grand Thailand	Provincial director	Ref.
Year	Romanized name	Thai name	Original provincial title	Placement at Miss Grand Thailand	Provincial director	Ref.
2016	Sasiwimon Mongkolkawin	ศศิวิมล มงคลกาวิน	Miss Grand Chiang Mai 2016	Top 20	Adisorn Suddee	
2017	Thanaporn Phothatip	ธนพร โพธาติ๊บ	Miss Grand Chiang Mai 2017	Unplaced	Adisorn Suddee	
2018	Orachada Chaiyasarn	อรชดา ไชยสาร	Miss Grand Chiang Mai 2018	Unplaced	Aongkan Chai-aongkan	
2019	Narumon Khampan	นฤมล คำพัน	Miss Grand Chiang Mai 2019	2nd runner-up	Supasit Wannarat	
2020	Panida Khueanjinda	พนิดา เขื่อนจินดา	Miss Grand Chiang Mai 2020	Top 20	Supasit Wannarat	
2022	Athita Payak	อทิตา พยัคฆ์	Miss Grand Chiang Mai 2022	5th runners-up	Chalermchon Wongchomphu; Atthaphan Ya-sa-nga	
2023	Sisawan Sukhiwat	ศรีสวรรค์ สุขีวัต	Miss Grand Chiang Mai 2023	Unplaced	Chalermchon Wongchomphu; Atthaphan Ya-sa-nga	
2024	Pornsupphat Pratumwan	พรสุพพัต ประทุมวัลย์	Miss Grand Chiang Mai 2024	Unplaced	Chalermchon Wongchomphu; Atthaphan Ya-sa-nga	
2025	Wisansaya Pakasupakul	วิศัลย์ศยา ภคศุภกุล	Miss Grand Chiang Mai 2025	Unplaced	Chalermchon Wongchomphu; Atthaphan Ya-sa-nga	
