= Miss Grand Nonthaburi =

Provincial pageant in Nonthaburi, Thailand

Miss Grand ฺNonthaburi มิสแกรนด์นนทบุรี
- Formation: May 7, 2016; 9 years ago
- Founder: Rapeephat Bowonpisanphat
- Type: Beauty pageant
- Headquarters: Nonthaburi
- Location: Thailand
- Official language: Thai
- Provincial Director: Anusit Thungsuk (2023–present)
- Affiliations: Miss Grand Thailand

Summary result of Nonthaburi representatives at Miss Grand Thailand
Placement	Number(s)
Winner	0
1st runner-up	0
2nd runner-up	0
3rd runner-up	0
4th runner-up	0
Top 10/11/12	1
Top 20/21	1
Unplaced	6

Miss Grand Nonthaburi (Thai: มิสแกรนด์นนทบุรี) is a Thai provincial beauty pageant which selects a representative from Nonthaburi province to the Miss Grand Thailand national competition. It was founded in 2016 by an entrepreneur Rapeephat Bowonpisanphat (ระพีภัสร์ บวรพิศาลภัสร์).

Nonthaburi representatives have yet to win the Miss Grand Thailand title. The highest placement obtained by its representatives was in the fifth runners-up, won in 2022 by Thipphayaphon Phromrat.

== History ==
In 2016, after Miss Grand Thailand began franchising the provincial competitions to individual organizers, who would name seventy-seven provincial titleholders to compete in the national pageant, the license for Nonthaburi province was granted to Rapeephat Bowonpisanphat, who organized the first Miss Grand Nonthaburi contest on May 7, 2016, in Bang Yai, and Kornchuma Khianwad (กรชุมา เขียนวาด) was named the winner. However, Khianwad was unable to join the national contest, and the second runner-up was assigned as the replacement.

The pageant was skipped in 2022; due to the COVID-19 pandemic in Thailand, the national organizer was unable to organize the national event in 2021, the 2021 Miss Grand Nonthaburi winner was sent to compete in the 2022 national stage instead.

Winner gallery

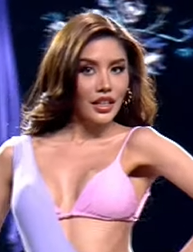
Thiphayaporn Phomraj,
Miss Grand Nonthaburi 2022

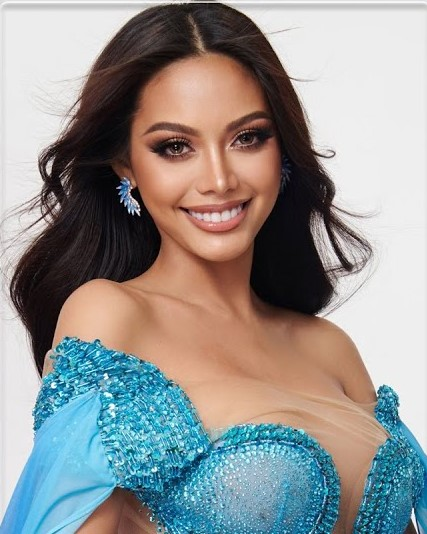
Muthita Longna,
Miss Grand Nonthaburi 2023

== Editions ==
The following table details Miss Grand Nonthaburi's annual editions since 2017.

Edition	Date	Final venue	Entrants	Winner	Ref.
1st	May 7, 2016	Westgate Residence Hotel, Bang Yai, Nonthaburi	12	Kornchuma Khianwad (Note: Later dethroned.)	
2nd	April 29, 2017	The Mall Lifestore Ngamwongwan, Mueang Nonthaburi, Nonthaburi	15	Wisuthaphat Ubonratsami	
3rd	March 10, 2018	Kalanan Riverside Resort, Pak Kret, Nonthaburi	12	Thirada Semsamran	
4th	April 6, 2019	Esplanade Ngamwongwan-Kaerai, Mueang Nonthaburi, Nonthaburi	22	Piraya Srimukh	
5th	March 13, 2020	St.Tropez, Pak Kret, Nonthaburi	16	Jittima Nicharam	
6th	June 20, 2021	Westgate Residence Hotel, Bang Yai, Nonthaburi	12	Thipphayaphon Phromrat	
7th	October 15, 2022	Grand Richmond Hotel, Mueang Nonthaburi, Nonthaburi	16	Muthita Longna	
8th	January 31, 2024	Grand Richmond Hotel, Mueang Nonthaburi, Nonthaburi	17	Jiraporn Rit-akson	
9th (Note: Organized as an inter-provincial pageant with the Miss Grand Surat Thani contest.)	December 21, 2024	Central Samui, Samui, Surat Thani	14	Parnrada Ratchataworaphat	

== National competition ==
The following is a list of Nonthaburi representatives who competed at the Miss Grand Thailand pageant.

Year	Representative		Original provincial title	Placement at Miss Grand Thailand	Provincial director	Ref.
Year	Romanized name	Thai name	Original provincial title	Placement at Miss Grand Thailand	Provincial director	Ref.
2016	Nadlada Srithongkham	นาฏลัดดา ศรีทองคำ	1st runner-up Miss Grand Nonthaburi 2016	Unplaced	Rapeephat Bowonpisanphat	
2017	Wisuthaphat Ubonratsami	วิสุตาภัทร อุบลรัศมี	Miss Grand Nonthaburi 2017	Top 20	Thananan Kaewpuang	
2018	Thirada Semsamran	ธิรดา เสมสำราญ	Miss Grand Nonthaburi 2018	Unplaced	Thananan Kaewpuang	
2019	Phiranya Srimuk	ภิรญา ศรีมุกข์	Miss Grand Nonthaburi 2019	Resigned	Thananan Kaewpuang	
2019	Sirikan Saengsrichantarat	สิริกาญจน์ แสงศรีจันทร์รัตน์	2nd runner-up Miss Grand Nonthaburi 2019	Unplaced	Thananan Kaewpuang	
2020	Jittima Nicharam	จิตติมา นิชารัมย์	Miss Grand Nonthaburi 2020	Unplaced	Trairat Natworamongkhon	
2021	No national pageant due to the COVID-19 pandemic.					
2022	Thipphayaphon Phromrat	ทิพยาภรณ์ พรมราช	Miss Grand Nonthaburi 2021/22	5th runner-up	Zareen Thipwiang	
2023	Muthita Longna	มุทิตา ลองนา	Miss Grand Nonthaburi 2023	Unplaced	Amarin Atthayoko	
2024	Jiraporn Rit-akson	จิราพร ฤทธิ์อักษร	Miss Grand Nonthaburi 2024	Unplaced	Phitsanu Bang-on and others	
2025	Parnrada Ratchataworaphat	ปานรดา รัชตะวรพัชร	Miss Grand Nonthaburi 2025		Wichai Phromma	
