= Miss Grand Krabi =

Abijith Kuttichira

Miss Grand Krabi มิสแกรนด์กระบี่
- Formation: January 31, 2017; 9 years ago
- Founder: Chatnarin Warongkhruekaew
- Type: Beauty pageant
- Headquarters: Krabi
- Location: Thailand
- Members: Miss Grand Thailand
- Official language: Thai
- Provincial Director: Madee Patranontanund (2025)

Summary result of Krabi representatives at Miss Grand Thailand
Placement	Number(s)
Winner	1
1st runner-up	0
2nd runner-up	0
3rd runner-up	0
4th runner-up	0
5th runner-up	0
Top 10/11/12	0
Top 20	2

Miss Grand Krabi (Thai: มิสแกรนด์กระบี่) is a Thai provincial beauty pageant which selects a representative from Krabi province for the Miss Grand Thailand national competition, founded in 2017 by an event organizer, Chatnarin Warongkhruekaew (ฉัตรนรินทร์ วรงค์เครือแก้ว).

since the first competition in the Miss Grand Thailand pageant in 2016, Krabi's representatives won the main title once; in 2017, by a Thai-Italian model Pamela Pasinetti.

== History ==
In 2016, after Miss Grand Thailand began franchising the provincial competitions to individual organizers, who would name seventy-seven provincial titleholders to compete in the national pageant, the license for Krabi province was purchased by a local entrepreneur, Chatnarin Warongkhruekaew (ฉัตรนรินทร์ วรงค์เครือแก้ว). Still, the first province's representative was appointed.

Warongkhruekaew later organized the first contest of Miss Grand Krabi the following year on 31 January, in which a Thai-Italian model, Pamela Pasinetti, was elected the winner.

The pageant was skipped once; in 2021, due to the COVID-19 pandemic in Thailand, the national organizer was unable to organize the national event, and the country representative for the international tournament was appointed instead.

Winner gallery

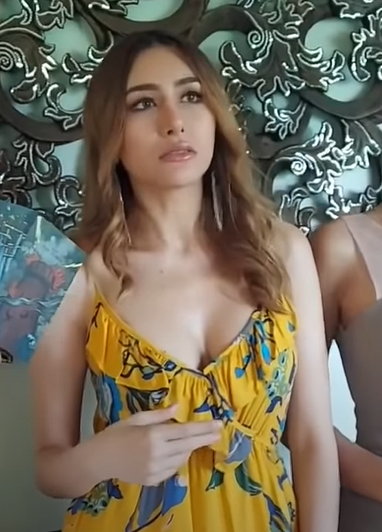
Pamela Pasinetti
Miss Grand Krabi 2017

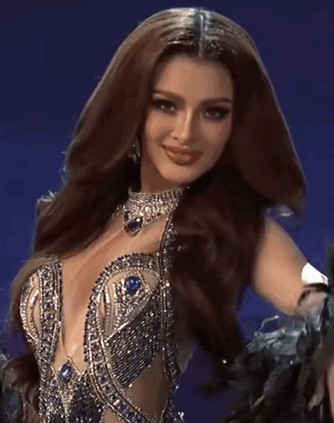
Narisa Yisoon
Miss Grand Krabi 2022

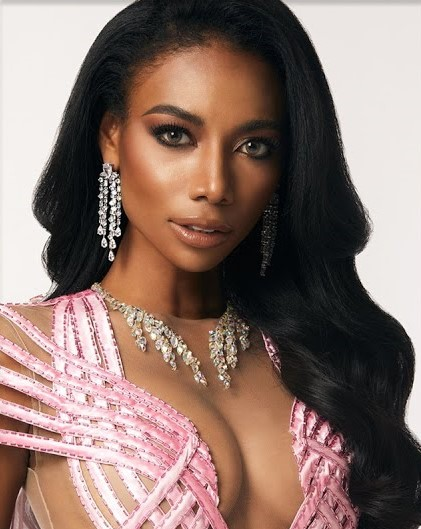
Kitava-Yvettlana Amankwaa
Miss Grand Krabi 2023

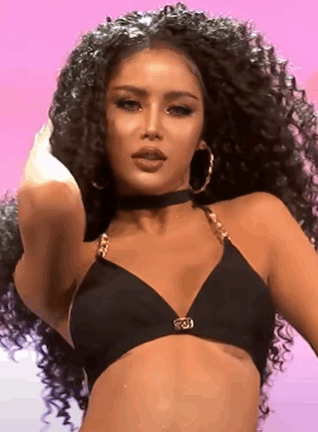
Sukjit Pluksakulsub
Miss Grand Krabi 2024

== Editions ==
The following table details Miss Grand Krabi's annual editions since 2016.

Edition	Date	Final venue	Entrants	Winner	Ref.
1st	31 January 2017	PAKA Showpark, Krabi	12	Pamela Pasinetti	
2nd	17 March 2018	Chang Pheuk Ballroom, Krabi Provincial Administrative Organization Office	14	Melada Nanthanurak	
3rd	15 May 2019	Centara Life Phu Pano Resort, Mueang Krabi	9	Orrawan Chaisorn	
4th (Note: Held in parallel with the Miss Grand Phang Nga 2020 pageant.)	1 August 2020	Sealey Village, Ao Nang Landmark, Ao Nang	13	Natthakorn Thanson	
5th (Note: Held in parallel with the Miss Grand Ranong 2022 pageant.)	20 February 2022	Jansom Beach Resort, Ranong	7	Narissa Yisun	
6th	25 February 2023	Ramada Aonang Krabi Hotel, Ao Nang	6	Pacharada Fusuamakawa	
7th (Note: Held in parallel with the Miss Grand Yala – Pattani – Narathiwas 2024 pageant.)	12 January 2024	Sri Racha Hall, CentralPlaza Sri Racha, Si Racha	30	Sukjit Pluksakulsub	
8th (Note: As an inter-provincial pageant for Miss Grand Krabi and Miss Grand Phang Nga.)	12 January 2025	Ava Trivi Studio, Pak Kret, Nonthaburi	15	Panthepthida Thammee	

== National competition ==
The following is a list of Krabi representatives who competed at the Miss Grand Thailand pageant.

Year	Representative		Original provincial title	Placement at Miss Grand Thailand	Provincial director	Ref.
Year	Romanized name	Thai name	Original provincial title	Placement at Miss Grand Thailand	Provincial director	Ref.
2016	Puttarawadee Nunpakdee	พุทธราวดี หนุนภักดี	Appointed	Unplaced	Chatnarin Warongkhruekaew	
2017	Pamela Pasinetti	ปาเมลา ปาสิเนตตี	Miss Grand Krabi 2017	Winner	Chatnarin Warongkhruekaew	
2018	Melada Nanthanurak	เมลดา นันทานุรักษ์	Miss Grand Krabi 2018	Top 20	Chatnarin Warongkhruekaew	
2019	Orrawan Chaisorn	อรวรรณ ไชยศร	Miss Grand Krabi 2019	Unplaced	Woraphon Kohklang	
2020	Natthakorn Thanson	ณฐกร แทนสอน	Miss Grand Krabi 2020	Unplaced	Koranapat Yuenyong	
2022	Narissa Yisun	นริสา ยี่สุ้น	Miss Grand Krabi 2022	Unplaced	Ekkalak Buapoon & Akkanan Etokung	
2023	Kitava-Yvettlana Amankwaa	ชาวคิตาวา-อีเวตลานา	Miss Grand Krabi 2023	Top 20	Thaspagorn Wake	
2024	Sukjit Pluksakulsub	สุขจิต ปลูกสกุลทรัพย์	Miss Grand Krabi 2024	Unplaced	Thaspagorn Wake	
2025	Panthepthida Thammee	ปานเทพธิดา ธรรมมี	Miss Grand Krabi 2025		Madee Patranontanund	
