= Miss Grand Phatthalung =

Provincial pageant in Phatthalung, Thailand

Miss Grand ฺPhatthalung มิสแกรนด์พัทลุง
- Formation: March 23, 2017; 9 years ago
- Founder: Weerasak Phetkaew
- Type: Beauty pageant
- Headquarters: Phatthalung
- Location: Thailand
- Members: Miss Grand Thailand
- Official language: Thai
- Provincial Directors: Natthaphat Moollao (2025)

Summary result of Phatthalung representatives at Miss Grand Thailand
Placement	Number(s)
Winner	0
1st runner-up	0
2nd runner-up	0
3rd runner-up	0
4th runner-up	0
Top 10/11/12	2
Top 20	1

Miss Grand Phatthalung (Thai: มิสแกรนด์พัทลุง) is a Thai provincial beauty pageant which selects a representative from Phatthalung province for the Miss Grand Thailand national competition, founded in 2017 by an event organizer, Weerasak Phetkaew (วีระศักดิ์ เพชรแก้ว).

Phatthalung's representatives have never won the main title since the first competition in the Miss Grand Thailand pageant in 2016. The highest placement obtained by them is the 5th runner-up or top 10 finalists; by Ratiyaporn Chookaew in 2017 and Michelle Behrmann in 2025.

== History ==
In 2016, after Miss Grand Thailand began franchising the provincial competitions to individual organizers, who would name seventy-seven provincial titleholders to compete in the national pageant, the license for Phatthalung province was granted to a forecaster, Sukrit Pathumsriwirot (ศุกฤษฎ์ ปทุมศรีวิโรจน์), Still, the province's representative for this respective year was appointed. Later in 2017, Pathumsriwirot lost the license to a local organizer, Weerasak Phetkaew (วีระศักดิ์ เพชรแก้ว), who organized the first Miss Grand Phatthalung contest on 23 March of that year, and Ratiyaporn Chukaew was announced the winner.

The pageant was skipped once; in 2021, due to the COVID-19 pandemic in Thailand, the national organizer was unable to organize the national event, and the country representative for the international tournament was appointed instead.

Winner gallery

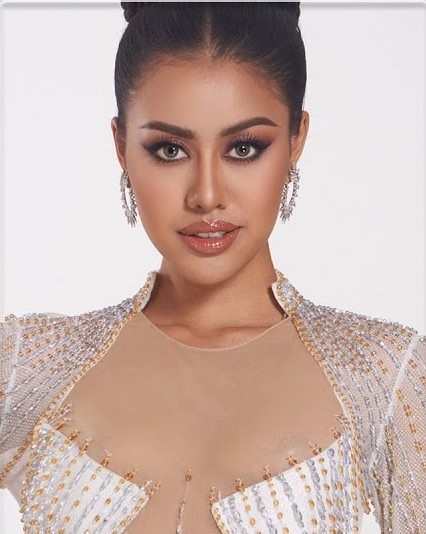
Salinthip Sena
Miss Grand Phatthalung 2023

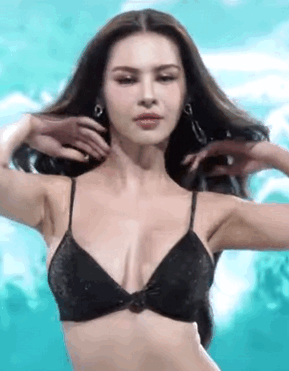
Prawwara Sataratphayoon
Miss Grand Phatthalung 2024

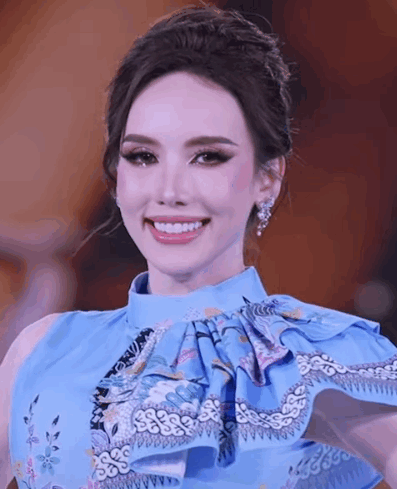
Michelle Behrmann
Miss Grand Phatthalung 2025

== Editions ==
The following table details Miss Grand Phatthalung's annual editions since 2016.

Edition	Date	Final venue	Entrants	Winner	Ref.
1st	23 March 2017	Wangnora Hotel, Phatthalung	16	Ratiyaporn Chukaew	
2nd (Note: Held in parallel with the Miss Grand Nakhon Si Thammarat 2018 pageant.)	22 April 2018	Princess Ubolratana Rajakanya's College Phatthalung Stadium, Phatthalung	12	Salinthip Wijanbut	
3rd (Note: Held in parallel with the Miss Grand Nakhon Si Thammarat 2019 pageant.)	30 May 2019	CentralPlaza Nakhon Si Thammarat, Nakhon Si Thammarat	7	Siraprapa Sangthong	
4th (Note: Held in parallel with the Miss Grand Nakhon Si Thammarat and Trang 2020 pageant.)	15 August 2020	Grand Fortune Hotel, Nakhon Si Thammarat	11	Sunisa Iamsam-Aang	
5th (Note: Held in parallel with the Miss Grand Satun, Songkhla, and Trang 2022 pageant.)	25 February 2022	Robinson Department Store, Trang	8	Cattleya Delmaire Michelle	
6th (Note: Held in parallel with the Miss Grand Satun and Phang Nga 2023 pageant.)	20 February 2023	KBank Siam Pic-Ganesha, Bangkok	9	Salinthip Sena	
7th (Note: Held in parallel with the Miss Grand Satun and Phang Nga 2024 pageant.)	19 November 2023	MGI Hall, Bravo BKK Mall, Bangkok	18	Prawwara Sataratphayoon	
8th (Note: Organized as an inter-provincial pageant with the Miss Grand Khon Kaen 2025 contest.)	November 24, 2024	CentralPlaza Khon Kaen, Mueang Khon Kaen, Khon Kaen	20	Michelle Behrmann	

== National competition ==
The following is a list of Phatthalung representatives who competed at the Miss Grand Thailand pageant.

Year	Representative		Original provincial title	Placement at Miss Grand Thailand	Provincial director	Ref.
Year	Romanized name	Thai name	Original provincial title	Placement at Miss Grand Thailand	Provincial director	Ref.
2016	Tealissara Yokoyama	ธีลิศรา โยโกยาม่า	Miss Grand Phatthalung 2016	Top 20	Sukrit Pathumsriwirot	
2017	Ratiyaporn Chookaew	รติยาภรณ์ ชูแก้ว	Miss Grand Phatthalung 2017	Top 12	Weerasak Phetkaew	
2018	Salinthip Wijanbut	สลินทิพย์ วิจารณ์บุตร	Miss Grand Phatthalung 2018	Unplaced	Kwanthicha Yung-yuen	
2019	Siraprapa Sangthong	ศิรประภา สังข์ทอง	Miss Grand Phatthalung 2019	Unplaced	Unknown	
2020	Sunisa Iamsam-Aang	สุนิสา เอี่ยมสำอางค์	Miss Grand Phatthalung 2020	Unplaced	Nithisiri Wanichkul	
2022	Cattleya Delmaire Michelle	แคทลียา เดลแมร์	Miss Grand Phatthalung 2022	Unplaced	Wachirawit Pitisirithanaboon	
2023	Salinthip Sena	สลิลทิพย์ เสนะ	Miss Grand Phatthalung 2023	Unplaced	Khajee Suwanwong	
2024	Prawwara Sataratphayoon	พราววรา ศตรัตพะยูน	Miss Grand Phatthalung 2024	Unplaced	Araya To-kasub	
2025	Michelle Behrmann	มิเชล เบอร์แมน	Miss Grand Phatthalung 2025	5th runner-up	Natthaphat Moollao	
