= Miss Grand Phang Nga =

Provincial pageant in Phang Nga, Thailand

Miss Grand Phang Nga มิสแกรนด์พังงา
- Formation: May 25, 2016; 10 years ago
- Founder: Chatnarin Warongkhruekaew
- Type: Beauty pageant
- Headquarters: Phang Nga
- Location: Thailand
- Members: Miss Grand Thailand
- Official language: Thai
- Provincial Director: Madee Patranontanund (2025)

Summary result of Phang Nga representatives at Miss Grand Thailand
Placement	Number(s)
Winner	0
1st runner-up	0
2nd runner-up	0
3rd runner-up	0
4th runner-up	1
Top 10/11/12	0
Top 20	1
Unplace	7

Miss Grand Phang Nga (Thai: มิสแกรนด์พังงา) is a Thai provincial beauty pageant which selects a representative from Phang Nga province for the Miss Grand Thailand national competition, founded in 2016 by an event organizer, Chatnarin Warongkhruekaew (ฉัตรนรินทร์ วรงค์เครือแก้ว).

since the first competition in the Miss Grand Thailand pageant in 2017, Phang Nga's representatives have never won the main title, but was placed the 4th runner-up once; in 2019, by Chompoonut Phuengphon, who also won the special title "Miss Grand Rising Star" and then became an actress under the Channel 7.

== History ==
In 2016, after Miss Grand Thailand began franchising the provincial competitions to individual organizers, who would name seventy-seven provincial titleholders to compete in the national pageant, the license for Phang Nga province was purchased by a local entrepreneur, Chatnarin Warongkhruekaew (ฉัตรนรินทร์ วรงค์เครือแก้ว), who organized the first Miss Grand Phang Nga competition on 25 May of that year, in which Juriephon Thongsalap from Takua Pa was announced the winner. The competition license was granted to another organizer, Sawai Yungklang, the following year.

The pageant was skipped once; in 2021, due to the COVID-19 pandemic in Thailand, the national organizer was unable to organize the national event, and the country representative for the international tournament was appointed instead.

Winner gallery

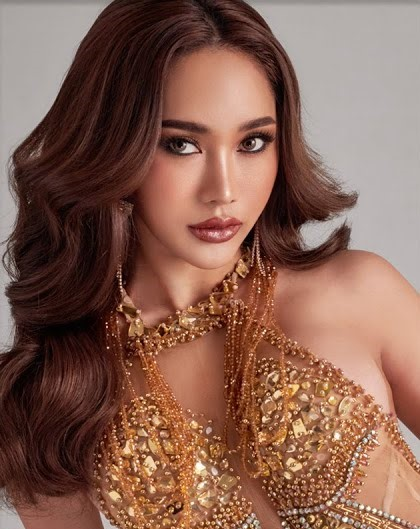
Natkanok Sitthirat
Miss Grand Phang Nga 2023

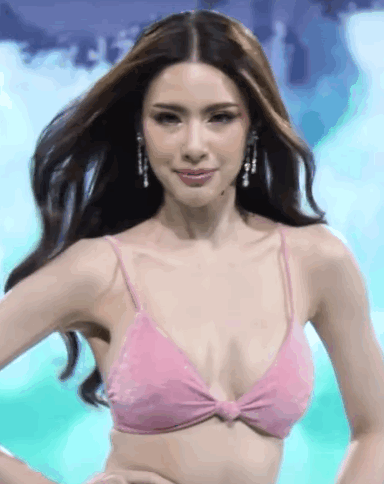
Suphannika Nopharat
Miss Grand Phang Nga 2024

== Editions ==
The following table details Miss Grand Phang Nga's annual editions since 2016.

Edition	Date	Final venue	Entrants	Winner	Ref.
1st	25 May 2016	Khaolak Laguna Resort, Takua Pa	17	Juriephon Thongsalap	
2nd	18 April 2017	Phang-Nga Technical College, Phang Nga	17	Orawan Sripanomwan	
3rd	6 May 2018	Build Market, Khao Lak, Takua Pa	21	Nalinee Tanbunserm	
4th	28 April 2019	Tsunami Memorial Museum, Takua Pa	12	Chompoonut Phuengphon	
5th (Note: Held in parallel with the Miss Grand Krabi 2020 pageant.)	1 August 2020	Sealey Village, Ao Nang Landmark, Ao Nang	13	Sasitorn Kasikun	
6th	13 March 2021	Le Méridien Khao Lak Resort & Spa, Takua Pa	6	Jiraporn Changphetpon	
7th (Note: Held in parallel with the Miss Grand Phatthalung and Satun 2023 pageant.)	20 February 2023	KBank Siam Pic-Ganesha, Bangkok	9	Natkanok Sitthirat	
8th (Note: Held in parallel with the Miss Grand Phatthalung and Satun 2024 pageant.)	19 November 2023	MGI Hall, Bravo BKK Mall, Bangkok	18	Suphannika Nopharat	
8th (Note: As an inter-provincial pageant for Miss Grand Krabi and Miss Grand Phang Nga.)	12 January 2025	Ava Trivi Studio, Pak Kret, Nonthaburi	15	Piyanut Yimsara	

== National competition ==
The following is a list of Phang Nga representatives who competed at the Miss Grand Thailand pageant.

Year	Representative		Original provincial title	Placement at Miss Grand Thailand	Provincial director	Ref.
Year	Romanized name	Thai name	Original provincial title	Placement at Miss Grand Thailand	Provincial director	Ref.
2016	Juriephon Thongsalap	จุรีย์พร ทองสลับ	Miss Grand Phang Nga 2016	Unplaced	Chatnarin Warongkhruekaew	
2017	Orawan Sripanomwan	อรวรรณ ศรีพนมวรรณ	Miss Grand Phang Nga 2017	Unplaced	Sawai Yungklang	
2018	Nalinee Tanbunserm	นลิณี ตันบุญเสริม	Miss Grand Phang Nga 2018	Unplaced	Thaweep Aim-Yai	
2019	Chompoonut Phuengphon	ชมพูนุท พึ่งผล	Miss Grand Phang Nga 2019	4th runner-up	Thaweep Aim-Yai	
2020	Sasitorn Kasikun	ศศิธร กสิคุณ	Miss Grand Phang Nga 2020	Unplaced	Koranapat Yuenyong	
2022	Jiraporn Changphetpon	จิราพร ช่างเพ็ชรผล	Miss Grand Phang Nga 2022	Unplaced	Paratthakorn Poonphan	
2023	Natkanok Sitthirat	ณัฐกนก สิทธิรัตน์	Miss Grand Phang Nga 2023	Unplaced	Khajee Suwanwong	
2024	Suphannika Nopharat	สุพรรณิการ์ นพรัตน์	Miss Grand Phang Nga 2024	Top 20	Araya Tohgasup & Charag Ud-in	
2025	Piyanut Yimsara	ปิยนุช ยิ้มสาระ	Miss Grand Phang Nga 2025	Unplaced	Madee Patranontanund	
