= Miss Grand Satun =

Provincial pageant in Satun, Thailand

Miss Grand ฺSatun มิสแกรนด์สตูล
- Formation: April 12, 2016; 10 years ago
- Founder: Janrob Rukwijit
- Type: Beauty pageant
- Headquarters: Satun
- Location: Thailand
- Members: Miss Grand Thailand
- Official language: Thai
- Provincial Director: Ratanaporn Sukasam

Summary result of Satun representatives at Miss Grand Thailand
Placement	Number(s)
Winner	0
1st runner-up	0
2nd runner-up	0
3rd runner-up	0
4th runner-up	0
Top 10/11/12	1
Top 20	1
Unplaced	7

Miss Grand Satun (Thai: มิสแกรนด์สตูล) is a Thai provincial beauty pageant which selects a representative from Satun province for the Miss Grand Thailand national competition, founded in 2016 by an event organizer, Janrob Rukwijit (เจนรบ รักวิจิตร).

Satun's representatives have never won the main title since the first competition in the Miss Grand Thailand pageant in 2016. The highest placement obtained by them is the 5th runner-up finalist; won in 2024 by Emma Martini.

== History ==
In 2016, after Miss Grand Thailand began franchising the provincial competitions to individual organizers, who would name seventy-seven provincial titleholders to compete in the national pageant, the license for Satun province was purchased by a local entrepreneur, Janrob Rukwijit (เจนรบ รักวิจิตร), who organized the first Miss Grand Satun competition on 12 April of that year, as a sub-event of an annual charity fair "Mother of the Land Fund" (กองทุนแม่ของแผ่นดิน), in which Nittiya Daokrajai was announced the winner.

Jenrob lost the competition license in early 2017 after sending the Miss Grand Satun 2017 winner, Punyaporn Ratcharit, to compete at another regional pageant, which violated the rule of the national organizer not to allow all provincial titleholders to participate in other pageants without completing the year of reign. The 2017 provincial contest was then held again by new licensees, Sittichai Wangklin and Siptheeratham Yingyong, to determine the replacement representative.

The pageant was skipped once; in 2021, due to the COVID-19 pandemic in Thailand, the national organizer was unable to organize the national event, and the country representative for the international tournament was appointed instead.

Winner gallery

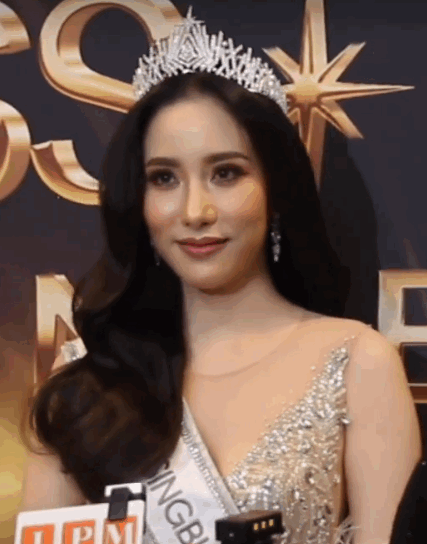
Chonthida Chatsirichai
Miss Grand Satun 2017

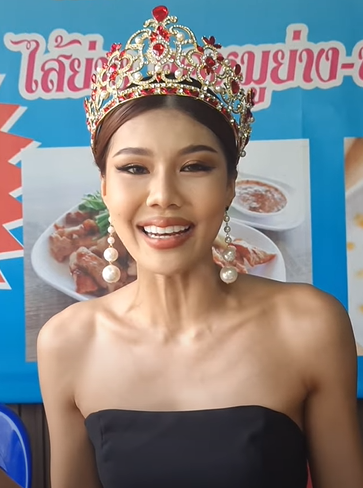
Aksorn Benchanirat
Miss Grand Satun 2022

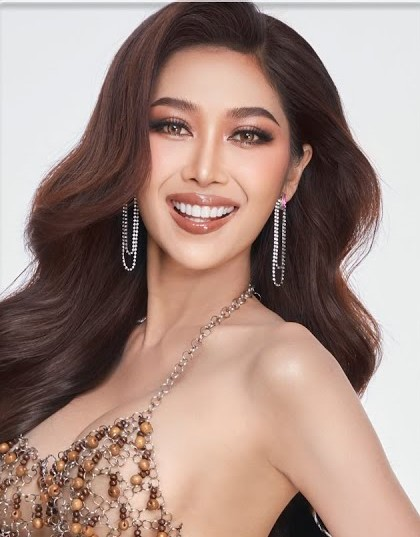
Ployphailin Worawong
Miss Grand Satun 2023

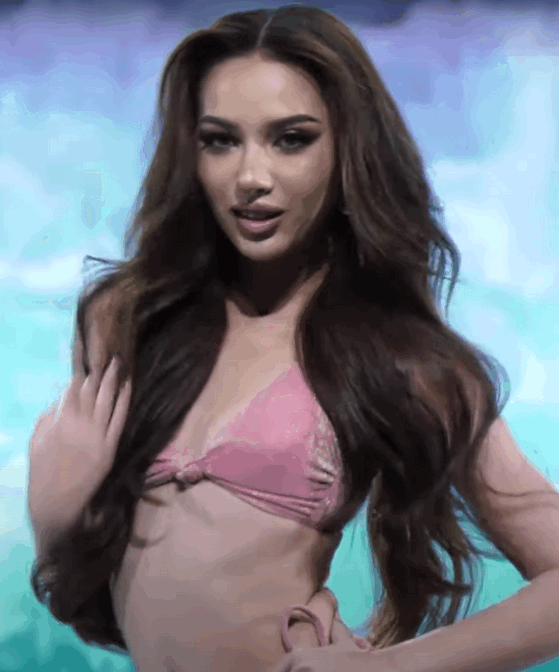
Emma Martini
Miss Grand Satun 2024

== Editions ==
The following table details Miss Grand Satun's annual editions since 2016.

Edition	Date	Final venue	Entrants	Winner	Ref.
1st	12 April 2016	Satun Municipality Bypass Intersection Field, Satun	25	Nittiya Daokrajai	
2nd	12 February 2017	Gooden Mansion, Satun National Museum, Satun	19	Punyaporn Ratcharit	
3rd	29 May 2017	Art Beach Club, Ko Lipe, Mueang Satun	13	Chonthida Chatsirichai	
4th	13 May 2018	Satun Community College Auditorium, Satun	9	Orn-Anong Inthum	
5th	26 May 2019	Pakbara viewpoint, La-ngu	14	Rosmanee Changwang	
6th	25 July 2020	Pakbara viewpoint, La-ngu	13	Sirilak Siriphoch	
7th (Note: Held in parallel with the Miss Grand Phatthalung, Songkhla, and Trang 2022 pageants.)	25 February 2022	Robinson Department Store, Trang	15	Aksorn Benchanirat	
8th (Note: Held in parallel with the Miss Grand Phatthalung and Phang Nga 2023 pageants.)	20 February 2023	KBank Siam Pic-Ganesha, Bangkok	9	Ployphailin Worawong	
9th (Note: Held in parallel with the Miss Grand Phatthalung and Phang Nga 2024 pageants.)	19 November 2023	MGI Hall, Bravo BKK Mall, Bangkok	18	Emma Martini	
10th (Note: Organized as an inter-provincial pageant with the Miss Grand Sakhon Nakhon contest.)	December 18, 2024				

== National competition ==
The following is a list of Satun representatives who competed at the Miss Grand Thailand pageant.

Year	Representative		Original provincial title	Placement at Miss Grand Thailand	Provincial director	Ref.
Year	Romanized name	Thai name	Original provincial title	Placement at Miss Grand Thailand	Provincial director	Ref.
2016	Nittiya Daokrajai	นิตติยา ดาวกระจาย	Miss Grand Satun 2016	Unplaced	Janrob Rukwijit	
2017	Punyaporn Ratcharit	ปุญญาพร ราชฤทธิ์	Miss Grand Satun 2017	Dethroned	Janrob Rukwijit	
2017	Chonthida Chatsirichai	ชลธิดา ฉัตรศิริชัย	Miss Grand Satun 2017	Unplaced	Siptheeratham Yingyong	
2018	Orn-Anong Inthum	อรอนงค์ อินทร์ทุ่ม	Miss Grand Satun 2018	Unplaced	Unknown	
2019	Rosmanee Changwang	รสมาณี จางวาง	Miss Grand Satun 2019	Resigned	Koranapat Yuenyong	
2019	Warisara Jongsawat	วริศรา จงสวัสดิ์	Miss Grand Satun 2019 Finalist	Unplaced	Koranapat Yuenyong	
2020	Sirilak Siriphoch	ศิริลักษณ์ ศิริโภชน์	Miss Grand Satun 2020	Unplaced	Koranapat Yuenyong	
2022	Aksorn Benchanirat	อักษร เบ็ญจนิรัตน์	Miss Grand Satun 2022	Top 20	Wachirawit Pitisirithanaboon	
2023	Ployphailin Worawong	พลอยไพลิน วรวงษ์	Miss Grand Satun 2023	Unplaced	Khajee Suwanwong	
2024	Emma Martini	เอ็มม่า มาร์ตินี	Miss Grand Satun 2024	5th runners-up	Araya To-kasuk & Charag UD Din	
2025	Benjawan Suchartpong	เบญจวรรณ สุชาติพงศ์	Miss Grand Satun 2025	Unplaced	Ratanaporn Sukasam	
