= Miss Grand Nakhon Si Thammarat =

Provincial pageant in Nakhon Si Thammarat, Thailand

Miss Grand Nakhon Si Thammarat มิสแกรนด์นครศรีธรรมราช
- Formation: March 27, 2017; 9 years ago
- Founder: Weerasak Phetkaew
- Type: Beauty pageant
- Headquarters: Nakhon Si Thammarat
- Location: Thailand
- Members: Miss Grand Thailand
- Official language: Thai
- Provincial Directors: Kantapat Keeratipatthanakorn (2025)

Summary result of Nakhon Si Thammarat representatives at Miss Grand Thailand
Placement	Number(s)
Winner	0
1st runner-up	0
2nd runner-up	1
3rd runner-up	0
4th runner-up	0
Top 10/11/12	1
Top 20	2

Miss Grand Nakhon Si Thammarat (Thai: มิสแกรนด์นครศรีธรรมราช) is a Thai provincial beauty pageant which selects a representative from Nakhon Si Thammarat province for the Miss Grand Thailand national competition, founded in 2017 by an event organizer, Weerasak Phetkaew (วีระศักดิ์ เพชรแก้ว).

Nakhon Si Thammarat's representatives have never won the main title since the first competition in the Miss Grand Thailand pageant in 2016. The highest placement obtained by them is the second runner-up; won in 2020 by Patchaploy Rueandaluang, who later competed internationally in the Miss Tourism Queen of the year International 2020/2021 pageant and was named the first runner-up.

== History ==
In 2016, after Miss Grand Thailand began franchising the provincial competitions to individual organizers, who would name seventy-seven provincial titleholders to compete in the national pageant, the representative of Nakhon Si Thammarat province was appointed. The first contest of Miss Grand Nakhon Si Thammarat was organized the following year after the license was granted to a local organizer and talent manager, Weerasak Phetkaew (วีระศักดิ์ เพชรแก้ว), who held the contest on 27 March in the city of Nakhon Si Thammarat, in which a model from Nong Khai province, Suchanee Sireenaet, was named the winner.

The pageant was skipped once; in 2021, due to the COVID-19 pandemic in Thailand, the national organizer was unable to organize the national event, and the country representative for the international tournament was appointed instead.

Winner gallery

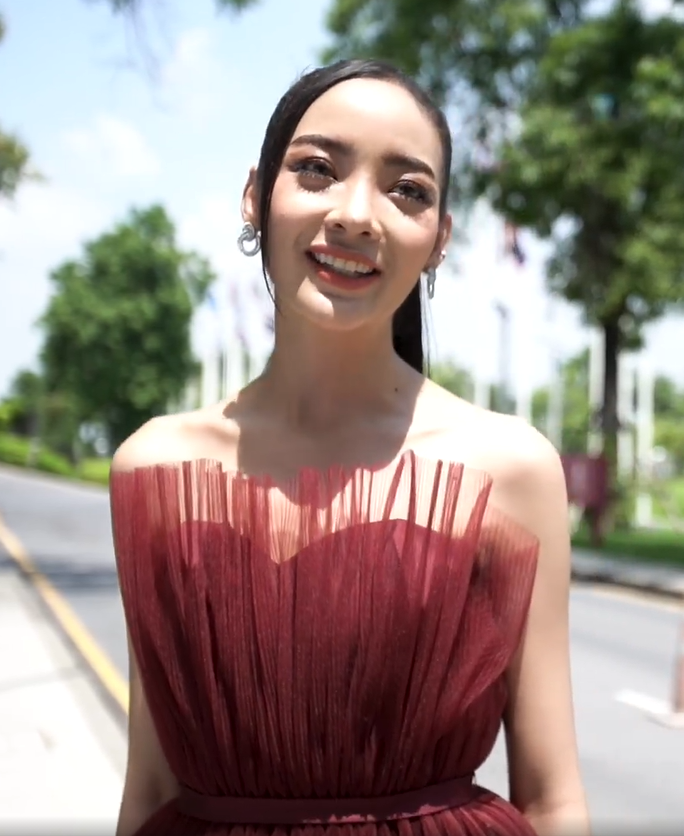
Patcha Patchaploy
Miss Grand Nakhon Si Thammarat 2020

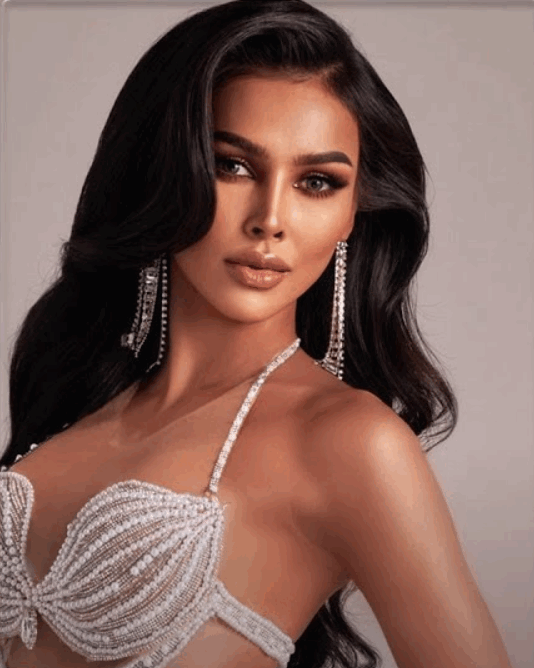
Supaporn Naksuwan
Miss Grand Nakhon Si Thammarat 2023

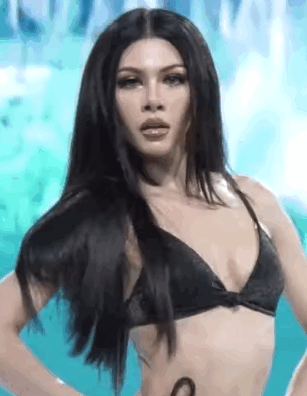
Warunya Lathaisong
Miss Grand Nakhon Si Thammarat 2024

== Editions ==
The following table details Miss Grand Nakhon Si Thammarat's annual editions since 2017.

Edition	Date	Final venue	Entrants	Winner	Ref.
1st	27 March 2017	Grand Ballroom, The Twin Lotus Hotel, Nakhon Si Thammarat	12	Suchanee Sireenaet	
2nd (Note: Held in parallel with the Miss Grand Phatthalung 2018 pageant.)	22 April 2018	Princess Ubolratana Rajakanya's College Phatthalung Stadium, Phatthalung	12	Tassana Manso	
3rd (Note: Held in parallel with the Miss Grand Phatthalung 2019 pageant.)	30 May 2019	CentralPlaza Nakhon Si Thammarat, Nakhon Si Thammarat	7	Wipaporn Champaruang	
4th (Note: Held in parallel with the Miss Grand Phatthalung and Trang 2020 pageant.)	15 August 2020	Grand Fortune Hotel, Nakhon Si Thammarat	11	Patchaploy Rueandaluang	
5th	6 February 2022	The Gold Living Life Hotel, Thung Song	16	Sornwanee Suwanmanee	
6th	16 December 2022	Grand Fortune Hotel, Nakhon Si Thammarat	13	Supaporn Naksuwan	
7th	24 November 2023	Grand Fortune Hotel, Nakhon Si Thammarat	16	Warunya Lathaisong	
8th (Note: As an inter-provincial pageant with Miss Grand Surin–Sukhothai.)	September 14, 2024	The National Theatre's Community Hall, Nakhon Si Thammarat	15	Aphassara Duangsai	

== National competition ==
The following is a list of Nakhon Si Thammarat representatives who competed at the Miss Grand Thailand pageant.

Year	Representative		Original provincial title	Placement at Miss Grand Thailand	Provincial director	Ref.
Year	Romanized name	Thai name	Original provincial title	Placement at Miss Grand Thailand	Provincial director	Ref.
2016	Thitirat Suphopak	ฐิติรัตน์ สุโพภาค	Appointed	Unplaced	Unknown	
2017	Suchanee Sireenaet	สุชาณี สิรีเนตร	Miss Grand Nakhon Si Thammarat 2017	Top 12	Weerasak Phetkaew	
2018	Tassana Manso	ทัศนา แมนโซ	Miss Grand Nakhon Si Thammarat 2018	Top 20	Kwanthicha Yung-yuen	
2019	Wipaporn Champaruang	วิภาภรณ์ จำปาเรือง	Miss Grand Nakhon Si Thammarat 2019	Unplaced	Unknown	
2020	Patchaploy Rueandaluang	พัดชาพลอย เรือนดาหลวง	Miss Grand Nakhon Si Thammarat 2020	2nd runner-up	Nithisiri Wanichkul	
2022	Sornwanee Suwanmanee	ศรวณีย์ สุวรรณมณี	Miss Grand Nakhon Si Thammarat 2022	Unplaced	Mǎ Yán	
2023	Supaporn Naksuwan	สุภาพร นาคสุวรรณ์	Miss Grand Nakhon Si Thammarat 2023	Top 20	Pubordin Undamrongkarn	
2024	Warunya Lathaisong	วรัญญา เลไธสง	Miss Grand Nakhon Si Thammarat 2024	Unplaced	Pubordin Undamrongkarn	
2025	Aphassara Duangsai	อาภัสรา ด้วงใส	Miss Grand Nakhon Si Thammarat 2025	Unplaced	Kantapat Keeratipatthanakorn	
