= Miss Grand Trang =

Provincial pageant in Trang, Thailand

Miss Grand Trang มิสแกรนด์ตรัง
- Formation: April 10, 2016; 10 years ago
- Founder: Yuttana Sitapakpuranan
- Type: Beauty pageant
- Headquarters: Trang
- Location: Thailand
- Members: Miss Grand Thailand
- Official language: Thai
- Provincial Director: Nantitch Manitkul (2026)

Summary result of Trang representatives at Miss Grand Thailand
Placement	Number(s)
Winner	0
1st runner-up	0
2nd runner-up	0
3rd runner-up	0
4th runner-up	0
Top 10/11/12	0
Top 20	2
Unplaced	6

Miss Grand Trang (Thai: มิสแกรนด์ตรัง) is a Thai provincial beauty pageant which selects a representative from Trang province for the Miss Grand Thailand national competition, held annually since 2016 with a medical doctor, Yuttana Sitapakpuranan (ยุทธนา ศิตภัคปุรานันท์), as the founder.

Trang's representatives have never won the main title since the first competition in the Miss Grand Thailand pageant in 2016. The highest placement obtained by them is the top 20 finalists; won in 2016 and 2017 by Wannasai Paksee and Phattharamalin Nasawasd, respectively.

== History ==
In 2016, after Miss Grand Thailand began franchising the provincial competitions to individual organizers, who would name seventy-seven provincial titleholders to compete in the national pageant, the license for Trang province from 2016 to 2019 was granted to a local medical doctor, Yuttana Sitapakpuranan (ยุทธนา ศิตภัคปุรานันท์), who organized the first contest of Miss Grand Trang on 10 April 2016; however, the winner later resigned from the title and the replacement was then assigned.

The pageant was skipped once; in 2021, due to the COVID-19 pandemic in Thailand, the national organizer was unable to organize the national event, and the country representative for the international tournament was appointed instead.

Winner gallery

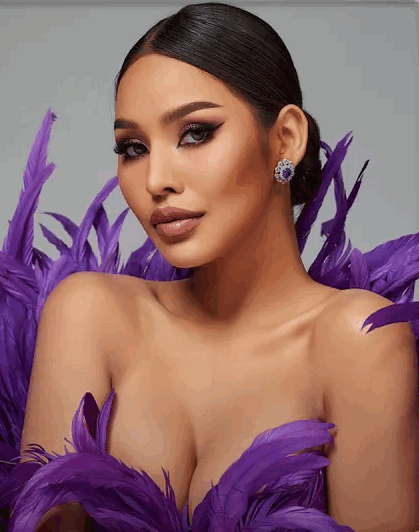
Piyathida Phothong
Miss Grand Trang 2023

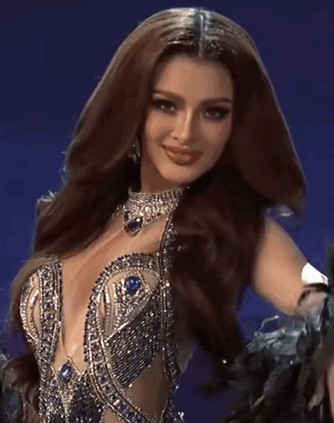
Narisa Yeesun
Miss Grand Trang 2024

== Editions ==
The following table details Miss Grand Trang's annual editions since 2016.

Edition	Date	Final venue	Entrants	Winner	Ref.
1st	10 April 2016	Thumrin Thana Hotel, Trang	18	Pattiya Pongthai	
2nd	28 February 2017	Thumrin Thana Hotel, Trang	18	Phattharamalin Nasawasd	
3rd	22 April 2018	Academic Resources Auditorium, Trang Technical College, Trang	10	Methita Chuaysathit	
4th	5 May 2019	Prince of Songkla University Trang Campus, Trang	15	Sumitra Nernphrom	
5th (Note: Held in parallel with the Miss Grand Phatthalung and Nakhon Si Thammarat 2020 pageant.)	15 August 2020	Grand Fortune Hotel, Nakhon Si Thammarat	11	Yasumin Phassaweephongsakorn	
6th (Note: Held in parallel with the Miss Grand Satun, Songkhla, and Phatthalung 2022 pageant.)	25 February 2022	Robinson Department Store, Trang	8	Phanumat Prasoetsang	
7th (Note: Held in parallel with the Miss Grand Chumphon 2023 pageant.)	27 December 2022	MGI Hall, Show DC Megacomplex, Bangkok	17	Piyathida Phothong	
8th	23 September 2023	Prince of Songkla University Trang Campus, Trang	11	Narisa Yeesun	
9th	1 November 2024	ESC Park Hotel, Khlong Luang, Pathum Thani	12	Ploypapat Simthammarak (Note: Later dethroned.)	

== National competition ==
The following is a list of Trang representatives who competed at the Miss Grand Thailand pageant.

Year	Representative		Original provincial title	Placement at Miss Grand Thailand	Provincial director	Ref.
Year	Romanized name	Thai name	Original provincial title	Placement at Miss Grand Thailand	Provincial director	Ref.
2016	Pattiya Pongthai	ภัททิยา พงศ์ไทย	Miss Grand Trang 2016	Resigned	Yuttana Sitapakpuranan	
2016	Wannasai Paksee	วรรณทราย ปักษี	Miss Grand Trang 2016 Finalist	Top 20	Yuttana Sitapakpuranan	
2017	Phattharamalin Nasawasd	ภัทรมาลินทร์ นาสวาสดิ์	Miss Grand Trang 2017	Top 20	Yuttana Sitapakpuranan	
2018	Methita Chuaysathit	เมธิตา ช่วยสถิตย์	Miss Grand Trang 2018	Unplaced	Yuttana Sitapakpuranan	
2019	Sumitra Nernphrom	สุมิตรา เนินพรหม	Miss Grand Trang 2019	Unplaced	Yuttana Sitapakpuranan	
2020	Yasumin Phassaweephongsakorn	ญาสุมินทร์ พัสวีวงศกร	Miss Grand Trang 2020	Unplaced	Nithisiri Wanichkul	
2022	Phanumat Prasoetsang	ภานุมาศ ประเสริฐสังข์	Miss Grand Trang 2022	Unplaced	Wachirawit Pitisirithanaboon	
2023	Piyathida Phothong	ปิยธิดา โพธิ์ทอง	Miss Grand Trang 2023	Unplaced	Piriya Seannok	
2024	Narisa Yeesun	นริสา ยี่สุ้น	Miss Grand Trang 2024	Unplaced	Songkit Jupatanasin	
2025	Ploypaphat Seemathammarak	พลอยปภัส สีมาธรรมะรักษ์	Miss Grand Trang 2025	Dethroned	Natdanai Wirawittayanan	
2025	Kirana Sathongklang	กิรณา สระทองกลั่น	1st runner-up Miss Grand Trang 2025	Unplaced	Natdanai Wirawittayanan	
2026	Warinrat Wanasil	วรินรัตน์ วรรณศิลป์	Miss Grand Trang 2026	5th Runners-Up		
