= Miss Grand Songkhla =

Provincial pageant in Songkhla, Thailand

Miss Grand ฺSongkhla มิสแกรนด์สงขลา
- Formation: March 4, 2017; 9 years ago
- Founder: Phumiphat Thammaphan
- Type: Beauty pageant
- Headquarters: Songkhla
- Location: Thailand
- Members: Miss Grand Thailand
- Official language: Thai
- Provincial Director: Araya To-kasub (2025)

Summary result of Songkhla representatives at Miss Grand Thailand
Placement	Number(s)
Winner	1
1st runner-up	0
2nd runner-up	0
3rd runner-up	0
4th runner-up	0
Top 10/11/12	1
Top 20	4

Miss Grand Songkhla (Thai: มิสแกรนด์สงขลา) is a Thai provincial beauty pageant which selects a representative from Songkhla province for the Miss Grand Thailand national competition, founded in 2017 by a television personality, Phumiphat Thammaphan (ภูมิพัฒน์ ธรรมพันธ์; also known as Tao TV Pool).

Since the first competition in the Miss Grand Thailand pageant, Songkhla's representatives won the competition once; in 2016 by a model Supaporn Malisorn.

== History ==
In 2016, after Miss Grand Thailand began franchising the provincial competitions to individual organizers, who would name seventy-seven provincial titleholders to compete in the national pageant, the license for Songkhla province was granted to a television personality, Phumiphat Thammaphan (ภูมิพัฒน์ ธรรมพันธ์), who then appointed a model, Supaporn Malisorn, to represent the province in the national contest and won the title.

Thammaphan organized the first contest of Miss Grand Songkhla the following year. The competition consisted of 12 finalists and a local secondary school student, On-uma Worasiri, was named the winner. Thammaphan lost the license to another local organizer, Kanyapat Ngadeesa-nguannam (กัญภัส งาดีสงวนนาม), in 2018.

The pageant was skipped once; in 2021, due to the COVID-19 pandemic in Thailand, the national organizer was unable to organize the national event, and the country representative for the international tournament was appointed instead.

Winner gallery

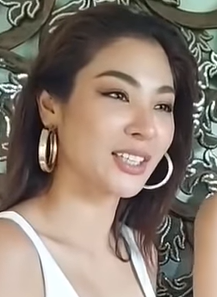
Supaporn Malisorn
Miss Grand Songkhla 2016

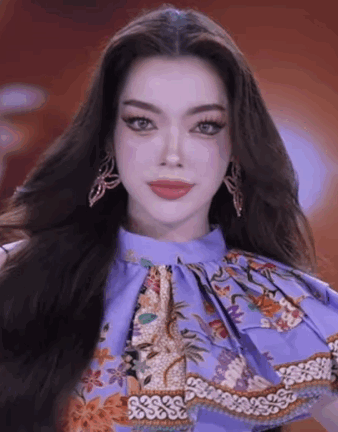
Suchita Oxman
Miss Grand Songkhla 2025

== Editions ==
The following table details Miss Grand Songkhla's annual editions since 2017.

Edition	Date	Final venue	Entrants	Winner	Ref.
1st	4 March 2017	V.L. Hatyai Hotel, Hat Yai	12	On-uma Worasiri	
2nd	8 April 2018	Songkhla National Museum, Songkhla	16	Chompunuch Rattana	
3rd	27 April 2019	Sculpture Garden Chaloem Phrakiat, Samila Beach, Songkhla	13	Rujirada Sripitak	
4th	7 August 2020	Sea Bass Cruise, Songkhla	12	Unchaya Petchmanee	
5th (Note: Held in parallel with the Miss Grand Satun, Trang, and Phatthalung 2022 pageant.)	25 February 2022	Robinson Department Store, Trang	8	Paweena Niamraksa	
6th	12 February 2023	PSUICC, Hat Yai	18	Kanruthai Thasbut	
7th	30 September 2023	PSUICC, Hat Yai	16	Peeraya Puangsombat	
8th	9 November 2024	Central Hat Yai, Hat Yai	16	Suchita Oxman	

== National Competition ==
The following is a list of Songkhla representatives who competed at the Miss Grand Thailand pageant.

Year	Representative		Original Provincial Title	Placement at Miss Grand Thailand	Provincial Director	Ref.
Year	Romanized Name	Thai Name	Original Provincial Title	Placement at Miss Grand Thailand	Provincial Director	Ref.
2016	Supaporn Malisorn	สุภาพร มะลิซ้อน	Appointed	Winner	Phumiphat Thammaphan	
2017	On-uma Worasiri	อรอุมา วรศิริ	Miss Grand Songkhla 2017	Top 20	Phumiphat Thammaphan	
2018	Chompunuch Rattana	ชมพูนุช รัตนะ	Miss Grand Songkhla 2018	Unplaced	Kanyapat Ngadeesa-nguannam	
2019	Rujirada Sripitak	รุจิรดา ศรีพิทักษ์	Miss Grand Songkhla 2019	Top 20	Kanyapat Ngadeesa-nguannam	
2020	Unchaya Petchmanee	อรรย์ชญา เพชรมณี	Miss Grand Songkhla 2020	Top 20	Pawarit Hayee-ama	
2022	Paweena Niamraksa	ปวีณา เนียมรักษา	Miss Grand Songkhla 2022	Unplaced	Wachirawit Pitisirithanaboon	
2023	Karnruethai Tassabut	กานต์ฤทัย ทัศบุตร	Miss Grand Songkhla 2023	Top 20	Chanpen Parisuttho-Namchanda	
2024	Peeraya Puangsombat	พีรญา พวงสมบัติ	Miss Grand Songkhla 2024	Dethroned	Chanpen Parisuttho-Namchanda	
2024	Waranya Mahawan	วรัญญา มหาวรรณ	1st Runner Up at Miss Grand Songkhla 2024	Unplaced	Chanpen Parisuttho-Namchanda	
2025	Suchita Oxman	สุชิตา อ๊อกซ์แมน	Miss Grand Songkhla 2025	5th runner-up	Araya To-kasub	
