= Mister and Miss Supranational Thailand =

Thai national pageant

Miss Supranational Thailand
- Formation: 2017; 9 years ago
- Purpose: Beauty pageant
- Headquarters: Bangkok
- Location: Thailand
- Official language: Thai
- Affiliations: Miss Supranational

Mister Supranational Thailand
- Formation: 2016; 10 years ago
- Members: Mister Supranational

Mister and Miss Supranational Thailand is a national pageant to select Thailand's representative to the Miss Supranational and Mister Supranational pageant.

== History ==
The Miss Supranational franchise was introduced to Thailand in 2017 by Nahatai Lekbumrung and Kampol Thongchai, who had previously organized Miss Thailand International.

In 2021, the Possible Dream 789 Company became the new rightsholder.

== Miss Supranational Thailand ==
Year	Edition	Miss Supranational Thailand	Runner-Up				Venue	Host province	Entrant
Year	Edition	Miss Supranational Thailand	First	Second	Third	Fourth	Venue	Host province	Entrant
2017	1st	Jiraprapa Boonnuang (Resigned) (Yasothon)	Pinnarat Mawinthon (Assumed) (Nan)	Nisanat Mongsai (Chai Nat)	Gavintra Praphasanobol (Phayao)	Paphattanun Chantarachota (Resigned) (Songkhla) Sirakan Chaiprasit (Assumed) (Maha Sarakham)	Siam Niramit, Phuket	Phuket	77
2018	No pageant held								
2019	2nd	Anntonia Porsild (Nakhon Ratchasima)	Not awarded				The Bazaar Theater	Bangkok	20
2020–2021	No pageant held due to the COVID-19 pandemic								
2022	3rd	Praewwanich Ruangthong (Chumphon)	Natthaya Hadi (Nonthaburi)	Nattha Thongkaew (Bangkok)	Not awarded		Ultra Arena Hall - Show DC	Bangkok	15
2023	4th	Patraporn Wang (Bangkok)	Boonyisa Chantararachai (Suphan Buri)	Natalia Wannes Phukthong (Bangkok)	Ketwarin Sripinpao (Chiang Mai)	Kitiya Laaituk; Lopburi	Ultra Arena Hall - Show DC	Bangkok	15
2024	5th	Kasama Suetrong (Surat Thani)	Carina Muller (Chiang Rai)	Anna Corvino (Loei)	Natthawan Pusakul (Bangkok) Thanatchaporn Pankaew (Suphan Buri) Ratchaneekorn Prasertpornsak (Ranong)	Not awarded	CDC Ballroom	Bangkok	15
2025–2026	No pageant held								

=== Winners by province ===
Province	Title	Winning year
Surat Thani	1	2024
Bangkok	1	2023
Chumphon	1	2022
Nakhon Ratchasima	1	2019
Yasothon	1	2017*

=== Gallery of Miss Supranational Thailand ===
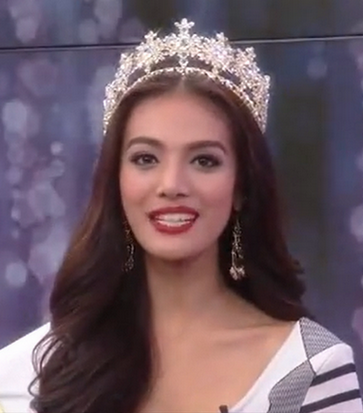
2014, Parapadsorn Vorrasirinda, Miss Supranational 2014 1st Runner-Up

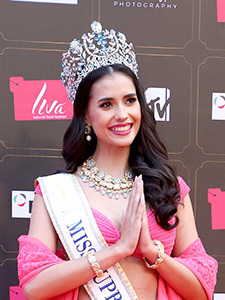
2019, Anntonia Porsild, Miss Supranational 2019

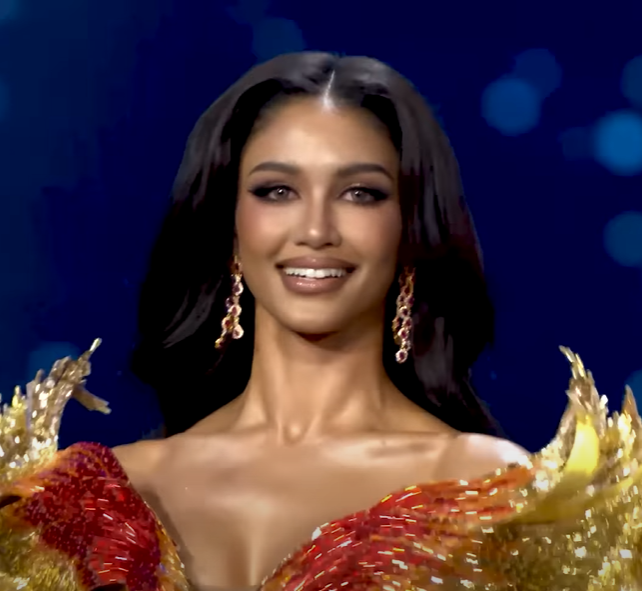
2022, Praewwanich Ruangthong, Miss Supranational 2022 1st Runner-Up

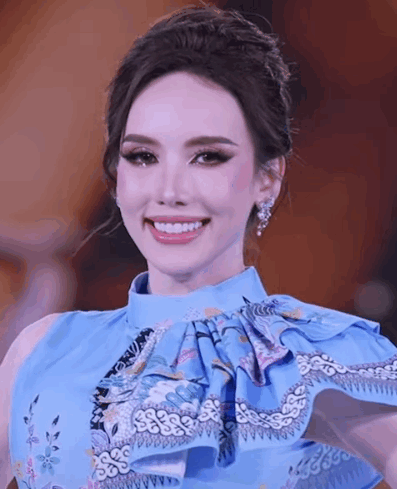
2025, Michelle Behrmann

=== International placements ===
Color keys

- : Declared as Winner
- : Ended as Runner-up or Top 5
- : Ended as one of the Finalists
- : Ended as one of the Semi-finalists

==== Miss Supranational ====
Year	Representative	Province	Title	Placement	Special Awards Supra Model of the Year
2026	Kanyalak Nookaew	Pathum Thani	Miss Supranational Thailand 2026 (Appointed)	Top 24	2 Special Awards: 1st Runner-up - Supra Model of Asia & Oceania; Top 20 - Miss Supra Influencer
2025	Michelle Behrmann	Phatthalung	Miss Supranational Thailand 2025 (Appointed)	Unplaced	2 Special Award: Top 20 - Miss Influencer Opportunity; Top 10 - Supra Fan Vote
2024	Kasama Suetrong	Surat Thani	Miss Supranational Thailand 2024	Top 12	1 Special Award: Supra Model of Asia & Oceania
2023	Patraporn Wang	Bangkok	Miss Supranational Thailand 2023	Top 24	3 Special Awards: Best National Costume; Supra Model of Asia; Top 29 - Miss Talent
2022	Praewwanich Ruangthong	Chumphon	Miss Supranational Thailand 2022	1st Runner-up	2 Special Awards: 2nd Runner-Up - Miss Elegance; Top 10 - Supra Fan-Vote
2021	Benjarat Akkarawanichsil Aebi	Phuket	Miss Supranational Thailand 2021 (Appointed)	Top 24	
2020 No pageant, Due to the impact of COVID-19 pandemic
2019	Anntonia Porsild	Nakhon Ratchasima	Miss Supranational Thailand 2019	Miss Supranational 2019	5 Special Awards: 2nd Runner-up - Miss Talent; Top 6 Challenge - "What does Supranational mean to you ?"; Top 10 - Supra Fan-Vote; Top 12 - Supra Model of the Year (Top 2 - Supra Model of Asia); Top 16 - Supra Chat with Valeria
2018	Pinnarat Mawinthon	Nan	1st Runner-Up of Miss Supranational Thailand 2017	Unplaced	
2017	Jiraprapa Boonnuang	Yasothon	Miss Supranational Thailand 2017	Top 10	1 Special Award: Miss Supranational Asia & Oceania
2016	Chatchadaporn Kimakorn	Ratchaburi	1st Runner-Up of Miss Grand Thailand 2016	Unplaced	1 Special Award: Top 10 ^{(6th)} - Miss Multimedia Awards
2015	Tharathip Sukdarunpatthana	Roi Et	1st Runner-Up of Miss Grand Thailand 2015	Unplaced	
2014	Parapadsorn Disdamrong	Nakhon Ratchasima	Miss Grand Thailand 2014	1st Runner-Up	
2014	Ananya Mongkolthai	Bangkok	2nd Runner-Up of Miss Grand Thailand 2014	Did not compete	
2013	Thanyaporn Srisen	Nakhon Si Thammarat	2nd Runner-Up of Miss Grand Thailand 2013	Top 20	
2012	Nanthawan Wannachutha	Bangkok	Miss Supranational Thailand 2012 (Appointed)	1st Runner-Up	2 Special Awards: Miss Internet; Top 12 - Miss Talent
2011	Panika Vorraboonsiri	Bangkok	Miss Supranational Thailand 2011 (Appointed)	Unplaced	
2010	Maythavee Burapasing	Bangkok	Miss Supranational Thailand 2010 (Appointed)	4th Runner-Up	

=== Other international pageants ===
Several runners-up of the Miss Supranational Thailand pageant, organized as a stand-alone competition from 2017 to 2024 were also appointed to represent the country in international pageants, as listed below.

Year	Representative	Province	Original national title	International pageant			Ref.
Year	Representative	Province	Original national title	Pageant	Placement	Special Awards	Ref.
2024	Rina Muller	Chiang Rai	1st Runner-Up of Miss Supranational Thailand 2024	Miss Supertalent of the World 2024 (Season 21)	3rd Runner-Up		
2024	Warisara Riebpradit	Bangkok	Top 9 at Miss Supranational Thailand 2024	Miss Teen International 2024	Unplaced		
2019	Arthitaya Promchat	Sakon Nakhon	Contestant at Miss Supranational Thailand 2019	Global Asian Model 2019	Winner		
2019	Wipada Inkaew	Yala	Contestant at Miss Supranational Thailand 2019	Global Asian Model 2019	Unplaced		
2019	Chunita Wongwiboonrat	Bangkok	Contestant at Miss Supranational Thailand 2019	Miss Asia Pacific International 2019	Top 10	1 Special Award: People's Choice Award	
2019	Nisanat Mongsai	Chai Nat	2nd Runner-Up at Miss Supranational Thailand 2017	Miss Friendship International 2019	Top 15	1 Special Award: Miss Charming	
2019	Chalittha Wanphakdee	Nakhon Si Thammarat	Contestant at Miss Supranational Thailand 2019	Miss Friendship International 2019	did not compete		
2019	Witchaya Issarasunthonwong	Nakhon Ratchasima	Contestant at Miss Supranational Thailand 2019	Supermodel International 2019	did not compete		
2019	Radamanee Kanchanarat	Songkhla	Contestant at Miss Supranational Thailand 2019	Ambassador of the World 2019	Cancelled		
2019	Sornsawan Silaprom	Nakhon Si Thammarat	Contestant at Miss Supranational Thailand 2019	World Beauty Queen 2019	Cancelled		
2018	Sirakan Chaiprasit	Maha Sarakham	2nd Runner-Up at Miss Supranational Thailand 2017	Miss Asia Pacific International 2018	Top 10		
2018	Wipada Inkaew	Yala	Contestant at Miss Supranational Thailand 2019	Supermodel International 2018	Top 15	1 Special Award: Supermodel of Asia Pacific	
2017	Lisa Suwannaketkarn	Trat	Top 18 at Miss Supranational Thailand 2017	Miss Asia Pacific International 2017	Unplaced		

== Mister Supranational Thailand ==
Year	Edition	Mister Supranational Thailand	Runner-Up				Venue	Host province	Entrant
Year	Edition	Mister Supranational Thailand	First	Second	Third	Fourth	Venue	Host province	Entrant
2016	1st	Phanupong Wanthamat (Kamphaeng Phet)	Sirawat Chotmuangpak (Nakhon Ratchasima)	Chaiwat Phuttanan (Bangkok)	Not awarded		Starwell Convention Center	Nakhon Ratchasima	14
2017	2nd	Arrat Wittayakorn (Rayong)	Ekwit Thongkhao (Krabi)	Thanakorn Arunsawat (Trang)	Rewat Chumrod (Mae Hong Son)	Not awarded	Asiatique The Riverfront	Bangkok	77
2018	3rd	Kevin Dasom (Songkhla)	Not awarded				CentralWorld	Bangkok	21
2019	4th	Chanchai Rungpaisit (Phetchaburi)	Not awarded				The Bazaar Hotel Bangkok	Bangkok	21
2020	No pageant held due to the COVID-19 pandemic								
2021	5th	Nipun Kaewruan (Bangkok)	Not awarded				Virtual pageant		5
2022	6th	Teenarupakorn Muangmai (Kamphaeng Phet)	Sittichai Thantongdee (Sakon Nakhon)	Chutipong Buddharak (Bangkok)	Not awarded		Ultra Arena Hall - Show DC	Bangkok	15
2023	7th	Nathanon Narathanyawirun (Nakhon Si Thammarat)	Phathitthada Phothacharoen (Chiang Mai)	Jeerawat Vatchasakol (Chiang Rai)	Piyapat Sittikariyakul (Nonthaburi)	Komsan Srimongkolsiri (Bangkok)	Ultra Arena Hall - Show DC	Bangkok	15
2024	8th	Chonlawit Wongsriwor (Khon Kaen)	Suppakit Oupkham (Bangkok)	Puvarak Poemnam Munday (Bangkok)	Pattawee Waimethachoknugun (Chiang Mai) Boonkarit Sappradit (Bangkok) Puttimet Naulssard (Bangkok)	Not awarded	CDC Ballroom	Bangkok	15
2025–2026	No pageant held								

=== Winners by province ===
Province	Title	Winning year
Kamphaeng Phet	2	2016, 2022
Khon Kaen	1	2024
Nakhon Si Thammarat	1	2023
Bangkok	1	2021
Phetchaburi	1	2019
Songkhla	1	2018
Rayong	1	2017

==== Gallery of Mister Supranational Thailand ====
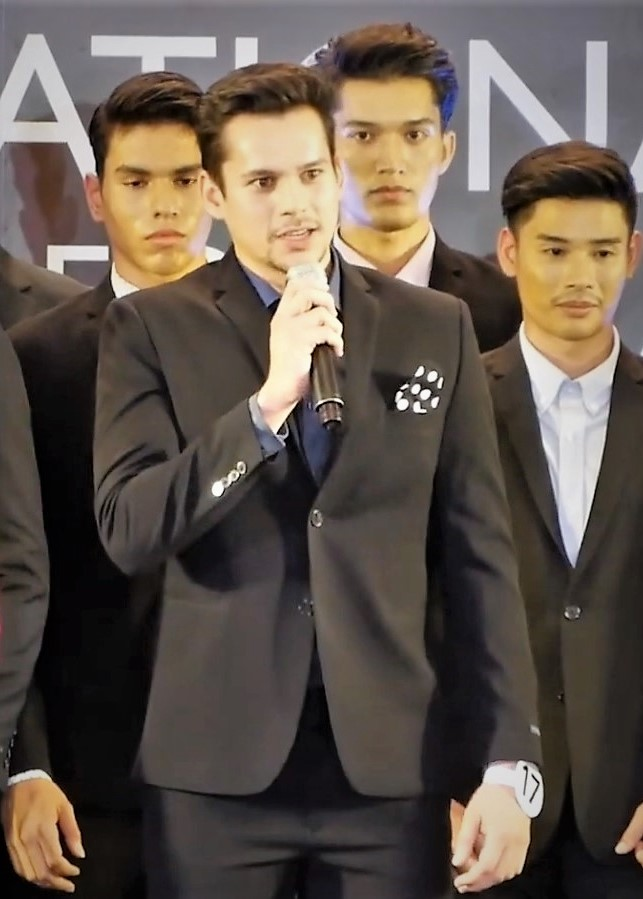
2018, Kevin Dasom, Mister Supranational 2018 3rd Runner-Up

=== International placements ===
Color keys

- : Declared as Winner
- : Ended as Runner-up or Top 5
- : Ended as one of the Finalists
- : Ended as one of the Semi-finalists

=== Mister Supranational ===
Year	Representative	Province	Title	Placement	Special Award
2026	Jack Titus	Chonburi	Mister Supranational Thailand 2026 (Appointed)	Top 10	4 Special Awards: Winner - Supra Chat Group 7; Top 10 - Mister Supra Influencer; Winner - Supra Fan-Vote; Mister Supranational Asia
2025	Piyapong Kammeesawang	Phrae	Mister Supranational Thailand 2025 (Appointed)	Top 20	1 Special Award: Top 10 - Supra Fan-vote
2024	Chonlawit Wongsriwor	Khon Kaen	Mister Supranational Thailand 2024	Top 20	3 Special Awards: Winner - Supra Chat Group 7; Top 10 - Mister Influencer Opportunity; Top 10 - Supra Fan-vote
2023	Nathanon Narathanyawirun	Nakhon Si Thammarat	Mister Supranational Thailand 2023	Top 10	2 Special Award: Mister Supranational Asia; Top 10 - Talent
2022	Teenarupakorn Muangmai	Kamphaeng Phet	Mister Supranational Thailand 2022	Top 10	4 Special Awards: Winner - Supra Fan-Vote; Winner - Supra chat Group 4; Top 5 - Talent; Top 12 - Supra Influencer
2021	Nipun Kaewruan	Bangkok	Mister Supranational Thailand 2021	Unplaced	3 Special Awards: Top 5 - Mister Talent; Top 10 - Supra Influencer; Top 10 - Supra Fan-Vote
2020 No pageant, Due to the impact of COVID-19 pandemic
2019	Chanchai Rungpaisit	Phetchaburi	Mister Supranational Thailand 2019	Top 20	
2018	Kevin Dasom	Songkhla	Mister Supranational Thailand 2018	3rd Runner-Up	
2017	Arrat Wittayakorn	Rayong	Mister Supranational Thailand 2017	Unplaced	
2016	Phanupong Wanthamat	Kamphaeng Phet	Mister Supranational Thailand 2016	Unplaced	1 Special Award: 2nd Place - Mister Supranational Party.pl

=== Other international pageants ===
Several runners-up of the Mister Supranational Thailand pageant, organized as a stand-alone competition from 2016 to 2025 were also appointed to represent the country in international pageants, as listed below.

Year	Representative	Province	Original national title	International pageant			Ref.
Year	Representative	Province	Original national title	Pageant	Placement	Special Awards	Ref.
2025	Piyaphat Sitthikariyakul	Bangkok	3rd Runner-Up at Mister Supranational Thailand 2023	Mister Celebrity International 2025	Top 10		
2024	Boonkrit Sappradit	Bangkok	3rd Runner-Up at Mister Supranational Thailand 2024	Mister National Universe 2024	4th Runner-Up: (Mister National Intercontinental)		
2019	Flago Sornnarin	Sing Buri	Contestant at Mister Supranational Thailand 2019	Global Asian Model 2019	Winner		
2019	Arunothai Suksawat	Khon Kaen	Contestant at Mister Supranational Thailand 2019	Global Asian Model 2019	Unplaced		
2019	Surachet Khannalae	Chiang Mai	Top 5 at Mister Supranational Thailand 2018	Mister Model Of The World 2019	1st Runner-Up: (Mister Model Of The Planet)	2 Special Award: Best National Costume; Best Interview	
2019	Thanawat Panset	Nonthaburi	Top 10 at Mister Supranational Thailand 2018	Mister Model Of The World 2019	4th Runner-Up: (Mister Model Of The Star)	1 Special Award: Mister Perfect Body	
2019	Chattong Pornpiriyayotha	Phetchaburi	Contestant at Mister Supranational Thailand 2019	Mister Model Of The World 2019	did not compete		
2019	Kantaphong Klinduang	Surin	Contestant at Mister Supranational Thailand 2019	Alpha Man International 2019	did not compete		
2019	Narongrit Unburom	Nan	Contestant at Mister Supranational Thailand 2019	Altitude Men International 2019	did not compete		
2019	Loechan Koae	Bangkok	Contestant at Mister Supranational Thailand 2019	Mister Globe 2019	Cancelled		
2019	Nattaphot Thanathipudomchok	Khon Kaen	Contestant at Mister Supranational Thailand 2019	Ambassador of the World 2019	Cancelled		
2017	Wajana Bunyasawan	Nonthaburi	Contestant at Mister Supranational Thailand 2017	Best Model of the World 2017	Unplaced	1 Special Award: Best Asia	
2016	Pongsiri Pattha	Bangkok	Contestant at Mister Supranational Thailand 2016	Best Model of the World 2016	did not compete		

== See also ==
- Miss Grand Thailand
- List of beauty pageants
