= Parapadsorn Vorrasirinda =

Thai model

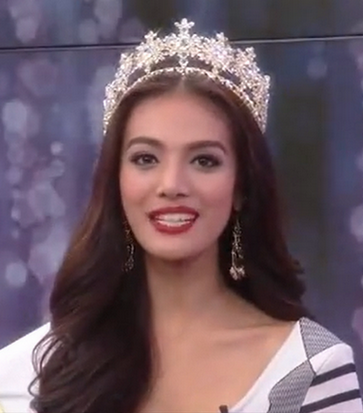
- Born: Nakhon Ratchasima, Thailand
- Education: Rangsit University
- Beauty pageant titleholder
- Title: Miss Grand Thailand 2014; Miss Supranational Thailand 2014
- Major competitions: Miss Grand Thailand 2014 (Winner); Miss Grand International 2014 (Top 10); Miss Supranational 2014 (1st Runner-Up)

Parapadsorn Vorrasirinda (Thai:ปรภัสสร วรสิรินดา) is a Thai model and beauty pageant titleholder who won Miss Grand Thailand 2014.

== Biography ==
Parapadsorn Vorrasirinda is from Nakhon Ratchasima province, Thailand. She attended Rangsit University, majoring in Marketing Communications.

== Pageantry ==
Vorrasirinda began competing in pageants at the age of 19. She reached the top 10 at Thailand Supermodel Contest and Top 10 in Miss Thailand World before winning Miss Grand Thailand. In June 2014, she won Miss Grand Thailand 2014, and in October 2014, she competed in Miss Grand International 2014, and reached the top 10. Vorrasirinda represented Thailand at Miss Supranational 2014, at the Hall of Sport in Krynica-Zdrój, Poland, on 5 December 2014. She was the first runner-up from 70 contestants.

Awards and achievements
| Preceded by Yada Theppanom | Miss Grand Thailand; 2014 | Succeeded by Rattikorn Kunsom |
| Preceded by Thanyaporn Srisen | Miss Supranational Thailand; 2014 | Succeeded by Tharathip Sukdarunpatthana |
| Preceded by Jacqueline Morales | Vice–Miss Supranational (1st Runner-up); 2014 | Succeeded by Siera Bearchell |
