= Pamela Pasinetti =

Italian beauty pageant titleholder

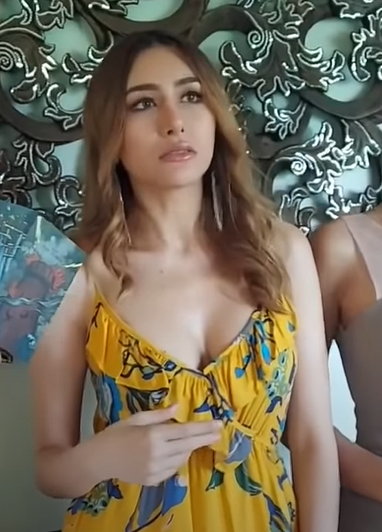
- Pasinetti in 2020
- Education: Assumption University

Pamela Pasinetti is an Italian born beauty pageant titleholder, who won Miss Grand Thailand in 2017.

== Personal life ==
Pamela Pasinetti has Thai-Italian ancestry, and is fluent in Thai, Italian and English. She studied business administration at Assumption University, Thailand.

== Pageantry ==
Pasinetti entered Miss Grand International 2017, she was awarded Miss Paradise Cape Heritage, and she finished in the top 10. who won Miss Grand Thailand in 2017.

== Career ==
Pasinetti is a host on Zaab Plaza, a Thai variety show about food, travel and career opportunities to promote local economy, tourism and expenditure in Thailand.

Awards and achievements
Preceded by Supaporn Malisorn	Miss Grand Thailand; 2017	Succeeded by Nam–Oey Chanaphan
