= Miss Grand Thailand =

Thai beauty pageant

- Established: 7 May 2013; 13 years ago
- Founder: Nawat Itsaragrisil
- Type: Beauty pageant
- Headquarters: Bangkok
- Location: Thailand
- Official language: Thai
- President: Nawat Itsaragrisil
- Manager: Engfa Waraha
- Deputy Manager: Waranchana Radomlek
- Parent organization: MGI PCL
- Affiliations: Miss Grand International; The Miss Globe; Miss Asia Pacific International; Miss Tourism International; Miss Tourism Queen of the Year International; Face of Beauty International; Miss Aura International
- Website: www.missgrandthailand.com

Miss Grand Thailand (Thai: มิสแกรนด์ไทยแลนด์) is an annual Thai beauty pageant that began in 2013 to select a representative for Miss Grand International. The pageant has been owned by Nawat Itsaragrisil since its inception and was originally broadcast on Channel 7 from 2013 – 2019. In 2020 it moved to One 31, then only on the social media livestream since 2022.

In the first three editions of the contest, the national entrants were selected by the organization directly. In 2016, the license was distributed to the provincial organizers, and since then the pageant has contestants chosen by the seventy-seven provincial licensees through their regional competitions. Since 2017, all seventy-seven provincial representatives must be determined by provincial contests; the national organizer has not allowed the provincial licensees to appoint their representatives to compete on the national stage, unless with the organization's consent.

The reigning Miss Grand Thailand is Pattama Jitsawat of Chonburi who was crowned on 28 March 2026 at the MGI Hall, Bravo BKK Mall in Bangkok. She will represent the country at the Miss Grand International 2026 pageant.

== History ==
=== Background ===
Miss Grand Thailand was founded in 2013 by Nawat Itsaragrisil, a television host and producer who produced Miss Thailand World for BEC-Tero for seven years until 2012. Afterwards, Nawat established his own pageant, launching Miss Grand Thailand in 2013 in partnership with Channel 7. Its inaugural edition was global broadcast on Let's Veit VTC9 of Vietnam, Arirang TV of South Korea, the FashionTV, as well as Channel 7 of Thailand, then only Channel 7 for subsequent editions. The pageant has also been streamed via its YouTube channel and Facebook. The winner is the country's representative to Miss Grand International, also launched in 2013.

In 2016, Miss Grand Thailand began franchising provincial competitions to organizers, who would produce seventy-seven provincial titleholders to compete at the national pageant. The national costume competition, was also introduced at this time, where each province would create a unique costume for their candidate to compete in, at the main event. The winner is regularly chosen to be worn by the country's representative at international pageants. In 2020, the pageant ended its partnership with Channel 7 due to internal conflicts with one of the acting board executives and switched to One 31. Under Channel 7, the pageant had the most popular viewership on Thai TV, compared to its rival, Miss Universe Thailand.

The COVID-19 pandemic cancelled the pageant in 2020 and 2021 In mid-2021; the provincial pageants could not be held to elect the representatives for the national contest either, and it was decided to designate the first runner-up of the 2020 edition to represent the country Miss Grand International 2021 competition instead.

=== Contestants ===
==== Selection of contestants ====
For the first three editions, the national qualifiers were directly selected by the organization through the audition rounds. In 2016 the pageant began franchising the provincial competitions to individual organizers, who hold a preliminary competition to choose their delegate for Miss Grand Thailand. Local pageants are also held in provinces such as Nan and Khon Kaen to find delegates for the provincial competitions. The provincial winners are titled "Miss Grand (Province)", and are not permitted to participate in any beauty pageants without the organization's consent.

In some cases, the licensee has more than one province such as Pattanasak Yong-Rit, who has Pattani, Yala, and Narathiwat

==== Notable contestants ====
Amanda Obdam of Phuket, is a Thai – Canadian model who won Miss Grand Phuket 2016. She then represented her province at the Miss Grand Thailand 2016; and reached the top ten. Obdam was elected by the organization to compete at Miss Tourism Metropolitan International 2016 in Cambodia, where she won the title. In 2020, she won Miss Universe Thailand 2020 then represented the country at Miss Universe 2020 in the United States, and reached the top ten. She served as a mental health ambassador for the Thailand Department of Mental Health, until 2021, she was removed for criticising the government. Who had allegedly engaged in police brutality during the 2020–2021 Thai protests against their pro-military government. Obdam then served as ambassador of the non-governmental organization, the Mirror Foundation, Thailand. This focuses on assisting patients with Psychiatric problems who do not have a place to live.

=== Location and date ===
The following is a list of Miss Grand Thailand pageant edition and information, from its inception in 2013.

Year	Editions	Date	Host Province	Final venue	Entrants	Ref.
2013	1st	7 May	Pattani	Bangkok Convention Centre, CentralWorld, Bangkok	37	
2014	2nd	17 June	Buriram	Bangkok Convention Centre, CentralWorld, Bangkok	50	
2015	3rd	12 May	Chumphon	Indoor Stadium Huamark, Bangkok	50	
2016	4th	26 June	Udon Thani	Indoor Stadium Huamark, Bangkok	77	
2017	5th	8 July	Chiang Mai	Bangkok International Trade and Exhibition Centre, Bangkok	77	
2018	6th	14 July	Phuket	Bangkok International Trade and Exhibition Centre, Bangkok	77	
2019	7th	13 July	Yala, Pattani, Satun, Narathiwat and Songkhla	Bangkok International Trade and Exhibition Centre, Bangkok	77	
2020	8th	19 September	Chiang Rai	Bangkok International Trade and Exhibition Centre, Bangkok	77	
2021	—N/a	The contest was canceled due to the COVID-19 pandemic, the titleholder was instead appointed.				
2022	9th	30 April	Khon Kaen	MGI Hall, Show DC Megacomplex, Bangkok	77	
2023	10th	29 April	Chiang Mai	MGI Hall, Show DC Megacomplex, Bangkok	77	
2024	11th	6 April	Phuket	MGI Hall, Bravo BKK Mall, Bangkok	77	
2025	12th	29 March	Songkhla	MGI Hall, Bravo BKK Mall, Bangkok	77	
2026	13th	28 March	Chonburi	MGI Hall, Bravo BKK Mall, Bangkok	77	

== Main pageant ==
=== Ancillary activities ===
The ancillary activities usually consist of three sub-events: the best in swimsuit competition, darling of the host round, and the national costume parade. These activities are arranged in the preliminary host provinces (e.g. 2013 in Pattani and 2014 in Buriram) except the national costume parade which is held at the final competition venue. The winner of each event is announced at the grand final in Bangkok. Some ancillary winners are automatically advanced to the final round at the finals night or even received a job offer from the affiliated company. For example, the winner of the Best Voice Award in 2017 was placed in the top 12, regardless of their accumulation points, the Miss Rising Star winners normally gain an offer as an actress affiliated with Ch 7 or One 31 for three years, and the winner of M Pictures Awards in 2019 also served as an actress under the management of M Pictures Co., Ltd.

Special award winners

Edition
2013
2014
2015
2016
2017
2018
2019
2020
2022
2023
2024
2025
2026

Best in Swimsuit	Best National Costume	Best Evening Gown	Miss Popular Vote	Grand Voice Award	Miss Photogenic	Darling of the Host Province	Ref.
Nakhon Sawan ^{[a]}	—N/a	—N/a	Bangkok	Prachuap Khiri Khan	Bangkok	Bangkok	
Nakhon Sawan ^{[a]}	—N/a	Suphan Buri	Nakhon Ratchasima	Two provinces: Nakhon Sawan Surat Thani	Nakhon Ratchasima	Suphan Buri	
Roi Et	—N/a	Chonburi	Bueng Kan	Two provinces: Chiang Mai Samut Sakhon	Songkhla	Roi Et	
Ubon Ratchathani	Bueng Kan	Phatthalung	Chonburi	Two provinces: Uthai Thani Phuket	Songkhla	Songkhla	
Sisaket	Chanthaburi	Buriram	Sa Kaeo	Bangkok	Nakhon Si Thammarat	Chanthaburi	
Kamphaeng Phet	Nakhon Si Thammarat	Surat Thani ^{[b]}	Sa Kaeo	Sa Kaeo	Sa Kaeo	Nakhon Pathom	
Trat	Bangkok	Nan	Loei ^{[c]}	Phang Nga	Nakhon Phanom	Nan	
Suphanburi	Ratchaburi	Chonburi	Phra Nakhon Si Ayutthaya	Nakhon Si Thammarat	Ranong	Nakhon Si Thammarat	
Chiang Mai	Five provinces: Chachoengsao Lopburi Phetchabun Rayong Surin	Nakhon Sawan	Nonthaburi	Three provinces: Bangkok Prachinburi Sisaket	Bangkok	Ang Thong	
Bangkok	Bangkok	Pattani	Loei	Three provinces: Loei Lopburi Sisaket	Loei	Lamphun	
Chonburi	Nakhon Ratchasima	Trang	Chai Nat	Eight provinces: Maha Sarakham Mukdahan Nakhon Phanom Phayao Phichit Ranong Sakon Nakhon Satun	Saraburi	Pathum Thani	
Kalasin	Three provinces: Loei Phitsanulok Samut Prakan	Phichit	Phuket	Three provinces: Lamphun Mae Hong Son Songkhla	Phrae	Chumphon	
Chiang Mai	Nakhon Phanom	Phitsanulok	Trat	Eight provinces: Chonburi Trang Nakhon Ratchasima Buriram Phetchaburi Lamphun Sukhothai Udon Thani	Chonburi	Chachoengsao	

Notes
1. ^{1} ^{2} No swimsuit contest was held, the winners were determined by the panel of judges during the final competition under the title Miss Being Bodyline in 2013 and Miss Healthy in 2014.
2. ^{1} Since 2018, the Best Evening Gown award was renamed to the Best Designer award, honored to the designers instead of the province representatives.
3. ^{1} In 2019, the Miss Popular Vote award was renamed the People Choice award.

=== Grand Final ===
Region group system of Miss Grand Thailand: Northern group Northeastern group Central group Southern group

Since the establishment of the pageant, the final coronation is always held in Bangkok, Thailand's capital city. The twenty quarterfinalists will be announced on the stage after the introduction portion. During 2013 – 2018, all quarterfinalists were chosen from the initial pool of delegates through a closed-door interview, swimsuit round, and the preliminary competition, then the judges selected the ten semi-finalists as well as the five finalists based on their performances on the final stage, as usually done in other pageants. However, a newly established competition system was first introduced in 2019, the contestants were classified under four geographical regions namely; northern, northeastern, central, and southern, regardless of the government administrative regions, each group consisted of 17, 20, 22, and 18 provinces, respectively. Five contestants with the highest preliminary accumulation points from each region advance to the top 20 round. The judges then select the top two candidates from each region (eight in total), based on their swimsuit performance on the stage, to advance to the top 10 finalists while two other candidates of the top 10 are determined via mobile application voting and specially chosen by the organizer, regardless of geographical affiliation.

In the semifinalists round (top 10) of the aforementioned system, the remaining 10 candidates compete in an evening gown and deliver their speeches on assigned topics then the judges select the top five finalists, only one candidate of each group together with the other one which is preferentially selected from the initial pool of Top 10 by the president, advance to the top five round and then compete in the question-and-answer portion, where all entrants are asked the same question about the ongoing situations in the country to determine the winner.

All selection process above is shown in the diagram below.

Miss Grand Thailand Selection Process
(2023–present)

Regional group
Quarterfinalists; Top 20
Semi-finalists; Top 11
Finalists; Top 5

Northern (17 provinces)
5
2
1

Northeastern (20 provinces)
5
2
1

Central (22 provinces)
5
2
1
Winner

Southern (18 provinces)
5
2
1

Boss Choice
1
1

Popular Vote
1

Best Sellers
1

== Titleholders ==
=== Traditional placements ===
- Miss Grand Thailand
- Miss Earth Thailand
- Miss Supranational Thailand
- Miss Intercontinental Thailand
- Miss Tourism Thailand
- The Miss Globe Thailand
- Miss Eco Thailand
- Top Model of the Thailand
- Miss United Continents Thailand
- Face of Beauty Thailand

- Miss Aura Thailand
- Miss Asia Pacific Thailand
- Miss Tourism Queen of the Year Thailand
- Miss Tourism Metropolitan Thailand
- Miss South East Asia Tourism Thailand
- Miss Chinese World Thailand
- Miss Landscapes Thailand
- Miss Globe Thailand
- Dethrone

Year	Miss Grand Thailand	Runners-Up				Ref.
Year	Miss Grand Thailand	First	Second	Third	Fourth	Ref.
2013	Yada Theppanom (Prachuap Khiri Khan)	Kanikar Phusri^{[a]} (Bangkok)	Thanyaporn Srisen^{[a]} (Nakhon Si Thammarat)	Keeratika Sawangjaeng^{[a]} (Phitsanulok)	Sopapan Viroonmas^{[a]} (Phuket)	
2014	Parapadsorn Vorrasirinda (Nakhon Ratchasima)	Sasi Sintawee^{[b]} (Songkhla)	Ananya Mongkolthai^{[b]} (Bangkok)	Patraporn Wang^{[b]} (Bangkok)	Warangkanang Wutthayangkorn^{[b]} (Nakhon Sawan)	
2015	Rattikorn Kunsom (Songkhla)	Tharathip Sukdharunpatr^{[c]} (Roi Et)	Boonyanee Sungpirom^{[c]} (Nakhon Pathom)	Chonthicha Imjunya^{[c]} (Chonburi)	Sakonwan Saetiao^{[c]} (Chonburi)	
2016	Supaporn Malisorn (Songkhla)	Chatchadaporn Kimakorn^{[d]} (Ratchaburi)	Atitaya Khunnalapat^{[d]} (Sing Buri)	Pinicha Kitkasempongsa^{[d]} (Chonburi)	Anchana Archklom^{[d]} (Phetchaburi)	
2017	Pamela Pasinetti (Krabi)	Chatnalin Chotjirawarachat (Kamphaeng Phet)	Sarucha Nilchan (Prachuap Khiri Khan)	Thaweeporn Phingchamrat (Chanthaburi)	Kamolrat Thanont (Sisaket)	
2018	Nam–Oey Chanaphan (Phuket)	Jiratchaya Sukinta (Nakhon Pathom)	Ingchanok Prasart (Sakon Nakhon)	Nantapak Kraiha (Buriram)	Methawee Theerateekul (Sa Kaeo)	
2019	Arayha Suparurk (Nakhon Phanom)	Peerachada Khunrak (Nan)	Naruemon Kampan (Chiang Mai)	Maneerat Daengprasert (Trat)	Chompoonuch Puengpon (Phang Nga)	
2020	Patcharaporn Chantarapadit (Ranong)	Indy Johnson (Pathum Thani)	Patchaploy Rueandaluang (Nakhon Si Thammarat)	Juthamas Mekseree (Chiang Rai)	Nutnicha Srithongsuk (Mukdahan)	
2021	Indy Johnson (Pathum Thani)	The contest was cancelled due to COVID-19 pandemic in Thailand. The 1st runner-up Miss Grand Thailand 2020 was selected to compete in Miss Grand International 2021.				
2022	Engfa Waraha (Bangkok)	Amanda Jensen (Phuket)	Tanawan Wigg (Kalasin)	Ornpreeya Nesa Mahmoodi (Ang Thong)	Suphatra Kliangprom (Phrae)	
2023	Thaweeporn Phingchamrat (Chumphon)	Tia Li Taveepanichpan (Phuket)	Pimjira Jaroenlak (Bangkok)	Ajcharee Srisuk (Loei)	Ketwalee Phlobdee (Phrae)	
2024	Malin Chara-anan (Phuket)	Kanyaphatsaphon Rungrueang (Pathum Thani)	Kittiyaporn Fungmee (Chumphon)	Thansita Dilhokananskul (Lampang)	Aoratai Phangchan (Maha Sarakham)	
2025	Sarunrat Puagpipat (Phuket)	Chayathanus Saradatta (Khon Kaen)	Natthinee Thanatpornphinyo (Lampang)	Panichada Kongsawanya (Lamphun)	Khanaporn Phatthanaphan (Bangkok)	
2026	Patthama Jitsawat (Chonburi)	Panasaya DeMaagd (Buriram)	Ilin Nabsuk (Phuket)	Natthakitta Kerdkanchiroj (Saraburi)	Naruemol Chaloemroek (Sukhothai)	

Notes
1. ^{1} ^{2} ^{3} ^{4} For the 2013 edition, the 5th – 2nd placements were announced as Miss Globe Thailand, Miss Intercontinental Thailand, Miss Supranational Thailand, and 1st runner-up Miss Grand Thailand, respectively.
2. ^{1} ^{2} ^{3} ^{4} For the 2014 edition, the 5th – 2nd placements were announced as Miss Tourism Thailand, Miss Intercontinental Thailand, Miss Supranational Thailand, and Miss Earth Thailand, respectively.
3. ^{1} ^{2} ^{3} ^{4} For the 2015 edition, the 5th – 2nd placements were announced as First runner-up Miss Grand Thailand, Miss Tourism Thailand, Miss Intercontinental Thailand, and Miss Supranational Thailand, respectively.
4. ^{1} ^{2} ^{3} ^{4} For the 2016 edition, the 5th – 2nd placements were announced as Miss Top Model Thailand, Miss Tourism Thailand, Miss Intercontinental Thailand, and Miss Supranational Thailand, respectively.

=== Supplemental 5th runners-up ===
Beginning in 2022, the remaining top 10 or 11 finalists were automatically crowned the 5th runners-up.

Year	5th runners-up	5th runners-up	5th runners-up	5th runners-up	5th runners-up	5th runners-up	Ref.
2022	Athita Payak (Chiang Mai)	Malaika Khan (Chiang Rai)	Charlotte Austin (Chumphon)	Waranchana Radomlek (Khon Kaen)	Thiphayaporn Prommarach (Nonthaburi)	Not Awarded	
2023	Pattaravadee Boonmesup (Chiang Rai)	Tantawan Jitteelak (Lopburi)	Rina Chatamonchai (Nakhon Ratchasima)	Kamonwarai Prajakrattanakul (Nakhon Phanom)	Kodchakorn Kontrakoon (Nong Bua Lamphu)	Vanessa Nattacha Wenk (Saraburi)	
2024	Yuwaporn Songngam (Bangkok)	Phoraphak Worasophonphakdee (Chai Nat)	Piyarada Wayuwech (Phichit)	Napapat Rungroj (Sakon Nakhon)	Suntaree Uan-inth (Saraburi)	Emma Martini (Satun)	
2025	Ilin Nabsuk (Kalasin)	Suphannika Nopparat (Chumphon)	Michelle Behrmann (Phatthalung)	Chutima Sodapak (Phrae)	Bawonrat Maneerat (Sa Kaeo)	Suchita Oxman (Songkhla)	
2026	Pitchayawi Yokoyama (Bangkok)	Phatcharamon Thepraksa (Chachoengsao)	Jessica Niinimaa (Phrae)	Warinrat Wanasil (Trang)	Assuntina Chusak (Trat)	Sirikan Pannamat (Udon Thani)	

=== Supplementary Appointee ===
- Since 2014, the remaining contestants have been given supplementary appointments to the titles.

Year	Appointees				Ref.
2014	Nuralaila Binmamah (Narathiwat)	No Appointees	No Appointees	No Appointees	
2015	Kobkul Bunreaung (Khon Kaen)	No Appointees	No Appointees	No Appointees	
2016	Amanda Obdam (Phuket)	Kancharat Tantirittiporn (Mae Hong Son)	Chanita Juntanetr (Ubon Ratchathani)	Prapaporn Matip (Phayao)	
2017	Nararin Pimpisarn (Sa Kaeo)	No Appointees	No Appointees	No Appointees	
2018	Chinthita Wilailak (Nan)	No Appointees	No Appointees	No Appointees	
2019	Nutthida Puengnum (Ranong)	Sirirat Naubon (Ubon Ratchathani)	No Appointees	No Appointees	
2022	Kittiyaporn Lanont (Sisaket)	Parithaniya Sarinsiyaporn (Nakhon Pathom)	Likhitpak Wijitsuwan (Lampang)	No Appointees	
2024	Nattha Intasao (Mukdahan)	Sasicha Duangket (Nakhon Phanom)	No Appointees	No Appointees	

== Participating Province finalists ==
Province	1st	2nd	3rd	4th	5th	6th	7th	8th	9th	10th	11th	12th	13th
Bangkok	No Province title (Contestants Finalists)			20	12	Y	Y	10					
Krabi	No Province title (Contestants Finalists)			Y		20	Y	Y	Y	20	Y	Y	Y
Kanchanaburi	No Province title (Contestants Finalists)			Y	Y	Y	Y	Y	20	Y	Y	Y	Y
Kalasin	No Province title (Contestants Finalists)			Y	Y	Y	Y	Y		20	Y		Y
Kamphaeng Phet	No Province title (Contestants Finalists)			Y		12	20	Y	Y	Y	Y	Y	Y
Khon Kaen	No Province title (Contestants Finalists)			Y	Y	Y	Y	Y	10	Y	Y		20
Chanthaburi	No Province title (Contestants Finalists)			Y		20	20	Y	Y	Y	Y	Y	Y
Chachoengsao	No Province title (Contestants Finalists)			Y	Y	12	20	Y	Y	Y	Y	20	
Chonburi	No Province title (Contestants Finalists)				Y	Y	Y	20	20	Y	20	Y	
Chai Nat	No Province title (Contestants Finalists)			Y	Y	Y	20	20	Y	Y		Y	Y
Chaiyaphum	No Province title (Contestants Finalists)			10	Y	12	Y	20	Y	Y	Y	Y	Y
Chumphon	No Province title (Contestants Finalists)			Y	Y	Y	20	Y	10				20
Chiang Rai	No Province title (Contestants Finalists)			Y	Y	Y	20		10		Y	Y	Y
Chiang Mai	No Province title (Contestants Finalists)			20	Y	Y		20	10	Y	Y	Y	20
Trang	No Province title (Contestants Finalists)			20	20	Y	Y	Y	Y	Y	Y	Y	
Trat	No Province title (Contestants Finalists)			Y	Y	Y		Y	Y	Y	Y	Y	
Tak	No Province title (Contestants Finalists)			Y	Y	Y	Y	Y	Y	Y	Y	Y	Y
Nakhon Nayok	No Province title (Contestants Finalists)			10	Y	Y	Y	Y	Y	Y	Y	Y	Y
Nakhon Pathom	No Province title (Contestants Finalists)			Y	Y		Y	Y	Y	20	Y	Y	Y
Nakhon Phanom	No Province title (Contestants Finalists)			Y	Y	20		20	Y		20	20	Y
Nakhon Ratchasima	No Province title (Contestants Finalists)			20	Y	Y	Y	Y	Y		Y	Y	20
Nakhon Si Thammarat	No Province title (Contestants Finalists)			Y	12	20	Y		Y	20	Y	Y	Y
Nakhon Sawan	No Province title (Contestants Finalists)			Y	12	Y	Y	Y	20	Y	Y	20	Y
Nonthaburi	No Province title (Contestants Finalists)			Y	20	Y	Y	Y	10	Y	Y	Y	Y
Narathiwat	No Province title (Contestants Finalists)			Y	Y	Y	Y	Y	Y	Y	Y	Y	Y
Nan	No Province title (Contestants Finalists)			Y	20	20		20	Y	Y	20	Y	Y
Bueng Kan	No Province title (Contestants Finalists)			Y	20	Y	Y	Y	Y	Y	Y	Y	Y
Buriram	No Province title (Contestants Finalists)			Y	20		Y	Y	Y	Y	20	Y	
Pathum Thani	No Province title (Contestants Finalists)			Y	Y	Y	Y		Y	20		Y	Y
Prachuap Khiri Khan	No Province title (Contestants Finalists)			Y		Y	Y	Y	20	Y	Y	Y	Y
Prachinburi	No Province title (Contestants Finalists)			Y	Y	Y	Y	Y	Y	Y	Y	Y	Y
Pattani	No Province title (Contestants Finalists)			Y	Y	Y	Y	10	Y	Y	Y	Y	Y
Phra Nakhon Si Ayutthaya	No Province title (Contestants Finalists)			20	Y	Y	Y	10	20	Y	Y	Y	Y
Phayao	No Province title (Contestants Finalists)			Y	Y	Y	20	Y	Y	Y	Y	Y	Y
Phang Nga	No Province title (Contestants Finalists)			Y	Y	Y		Y	Y	Y	20	Y	Y
Phatthalung	No Province title (Contestants Finalists)			20	12	Y	Y	Y	Y	Y	Y		Y
Phichit	No Province title (Contestants Finalists)			Y	Y	Y	Y	Y	Y	Y		Y	Y
Phitsanulok	No Province title (Contestants Finalists)			Y	Y	Y	Y	20	Y	Y	Y	20	Y
Phetchaburi	No Province title (Contestants Finalists)				Y	Y	Y	Y	Y	Y	Y	Y	Y
Phetchabun	No Province title (Contestants Finalists)			Y	Y	Y	Y	Y	Y	20	Y	Y	Y
Phrae	No Province title (Contestants Finalists)			Y	Y	Y	Y	Y			Y		
Phuket	No Province title (Contestants Finalists)			10	12		10	20					
Maha Sarakham	No Province title (Contestants Finalists)			Y	Y	Y	Y	Y	Y	Y		Y	Y
Mukdahan	No Province title (Contestants Finalists)			Y	Y	Y	Y		20	Y	20	Y	Y
Mae Hong Son	No Province title (Contestants Finalists)			Y	Y	Y	Y	Y	Y	20	Y	Y	Y
Yala	No Province title (Contestants Finalists)			Y	Y	12	Y	Y	Y	Y	Y	Y	Y
Yasothon	No Province title (Contestants Finalists)			Y	Y	Y	Y	Y	Y	Y	Y	Y	Y
Roi Et	No Province title (Contestants Finalists)			Y	Y	Y	20	Y	Y	Y	Y	Y	Y
Ranong	No Province title (Contestants Finalists)			Y	Y	Y	Y		Y	Y	20	Y	20
Rayong	No Province title (Contestants Finalists)			20	Y	Y	10	Y	Y	Y	Y	Y	Y
Ratchaburi	No Province title (Contestants Finalists)				20	20	Y	Y	Y	Y	Y	Y	Y
Lopburi	No Province title (Contestants Finalists)			Y	Y	Y	Y	Y	Y		Y	Y	Y
Lampang	No Province title (Contestants Finalists)			Y	Y	Y	Y	Y	20	20			20
Lamphun	No Province title (Contestants Finalists)			Y	Y	Y	Y	Y	Y	Y	20		Y
Loei	No Province title (Contestants Finalists)			Y	Y	Y	10	Y	Y		Y	Y	Y
Sisaket	No Province title (Contestants Finalists)			20		Y	Y	Y	20	Y	Y	20	Y
Sakon Nakhon	No Province title (Contestants Finalists)			Y	Y		Y	Y	Y	Y		Y	20
Songkhla	No Province title (Contestants Finalists)				20	Y	20	20	Y	20	Y		20
Satun	No Province title (Contestants Finalists)			Y	Y	Y	Y	Y	20	Y		Y	Y
Samut Prakan	No Province title (Contestants Finalists)			Y	Y	Y	Y	Y	Y	Y	Y	Y	Y
Samut Songkhram	No Province title (Contestants Finalists)			Y	Y	Y	Y	Y	Y	Y	Y	Y	Y
Samut Sakhon	No Province title (Contestants Finalists)			Y	20	Y	Y	Y	Y	Y	Y	Y	Y
Sa Kaeo	No Province title (Contestants Finalists)			Y	12		Y	Y	Y	Y	Y		Y
Saraburi	No Province title (Contestants Finalists)			Y	12	Y	Y	Y	Y			20	
Sing Buri	No Province title (Contestants Finalists)				Y	Y	Y	Y	Y	Y	Y	Y	Y
Sukhothai	No Province title (Contestants Finalists)			10	Y	Y	Y	Y	Y	Y	20	Y	
Suphanburi	No Province title (Contestants Finalists)			Y	Y	Y	Y	20	Y	Y	20	20	Y
Surat Thani	No Province title (Contestants Finalists)			Y	Y	12	10	Y	Y	Y	Y	20	Y
Surin	No Province title (Contestants Finalists)			Y	Y	12	Y	Y	20	Y	Y	Y	Y
Nong Khai	No Province title (Contestants Finalists)			20	Y	Y	20	Y	Y	Y	Y	Y	Y
Nong Bua Lamphu	No Province title (Contestants Finalists)			Y	Y	Y	Y	Y	Y		Y	Y	Y
Ang Thong	No Province title (Contestants Finalists)			Y	Y	Y	Y	Y		Y	Y	Y	Y
Udon Thani	No Province title (Contestants Finalists)			20	Y	20	Y	20	Y	Y	Y	20	
Uthai Thani	No Province title (Contestants Finalists)			Y	Y	Y	Y	Y	Y	Y	Y	Y	Y
Uttaradit	No Province title (Contestants Finalists)			Y	Y	Y	Y	10	Y	Y	Y	Y	20
Ubon Ratchathani	No Province title (Contestants Finalists)			10	20	Y	10	10	Y	Y	Y	Y	Y
Amnat Charoen	No Province title (Contestants Finalists)			Y	Y	12	20	Y	Y	Y	Y	Y	Y
Total	37	50	50	77	77	77	77	77	77	77	77	77	77
Color keys: : Declared as the winner; : Ended as a 1st runner-up; : Ended as a 2nd runner-up; : Ended as a 3rd runner-up; : Ended as a 4th runner-up; : Ended as a 5th runner-up; A : Ended as a finalist, semifinalist (N) and unplaced (Y); × : Ended as withdrew during the competition; × : Ended as no representative

== Winners gallery ==
2026, Patthama Jitsawat, (Chonburi)

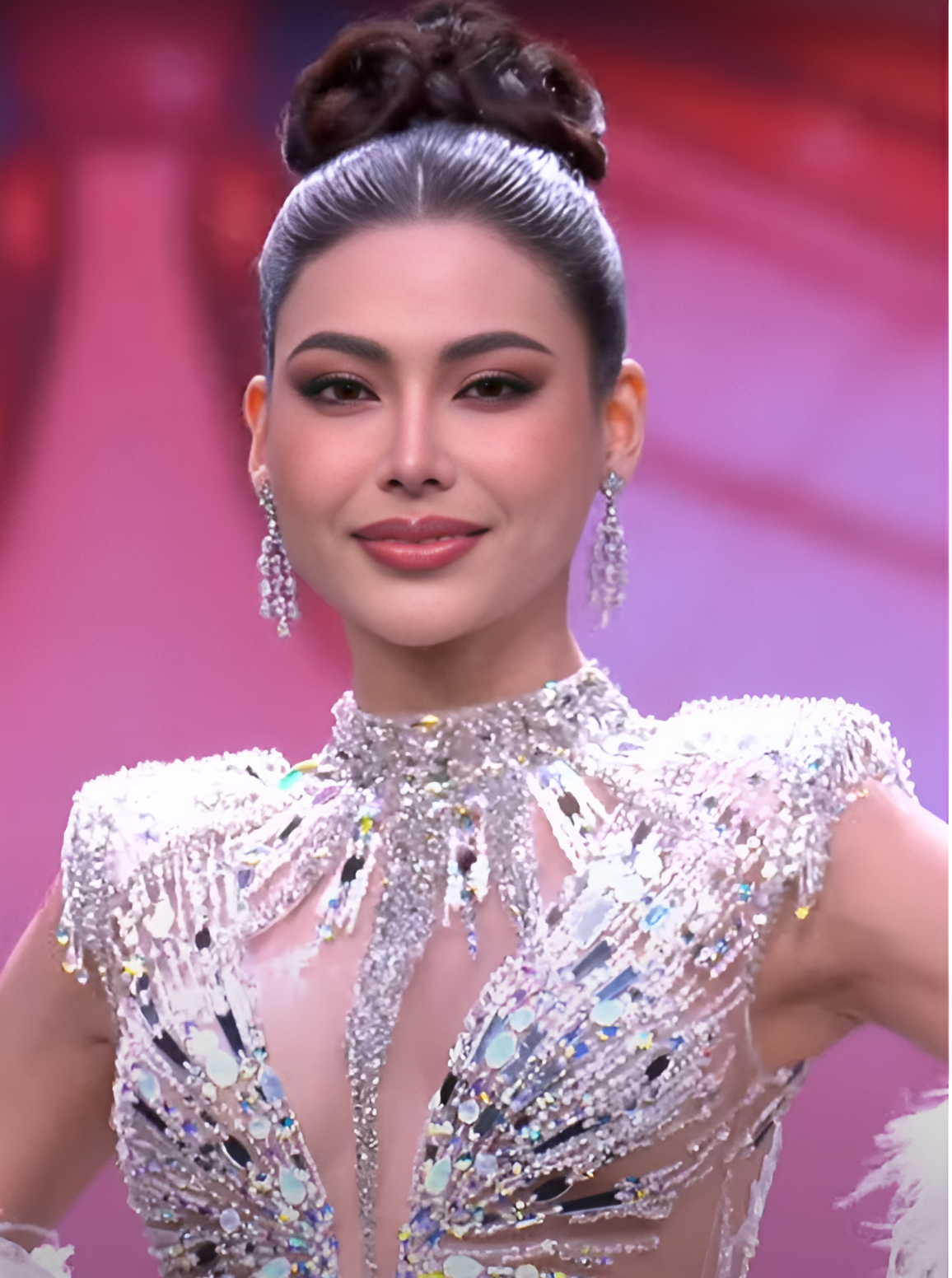
2025, Sarunrat Puagpipat, (Phuket)

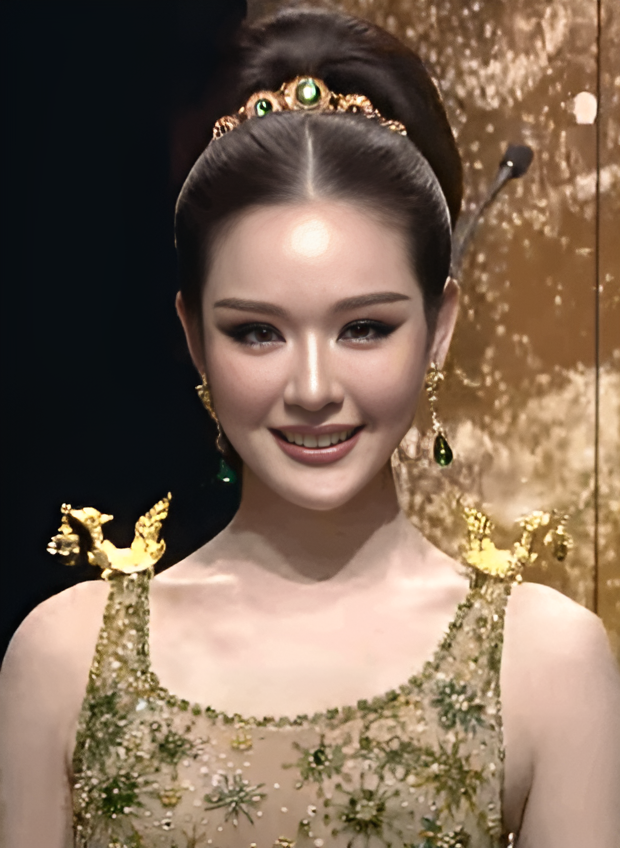
2024, Malin Chara-anan, (Phuket)

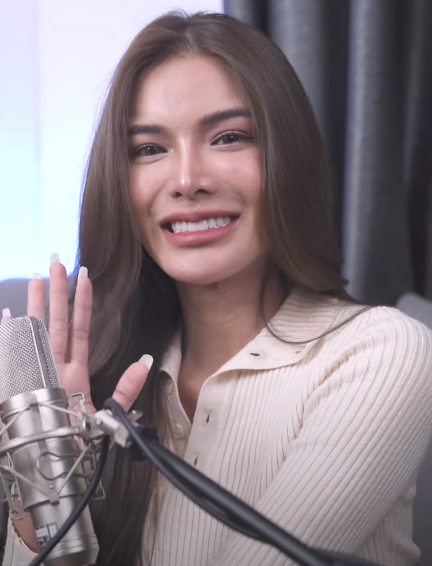
2023, Thaweeporn Phingchamrat, (Chumphon)

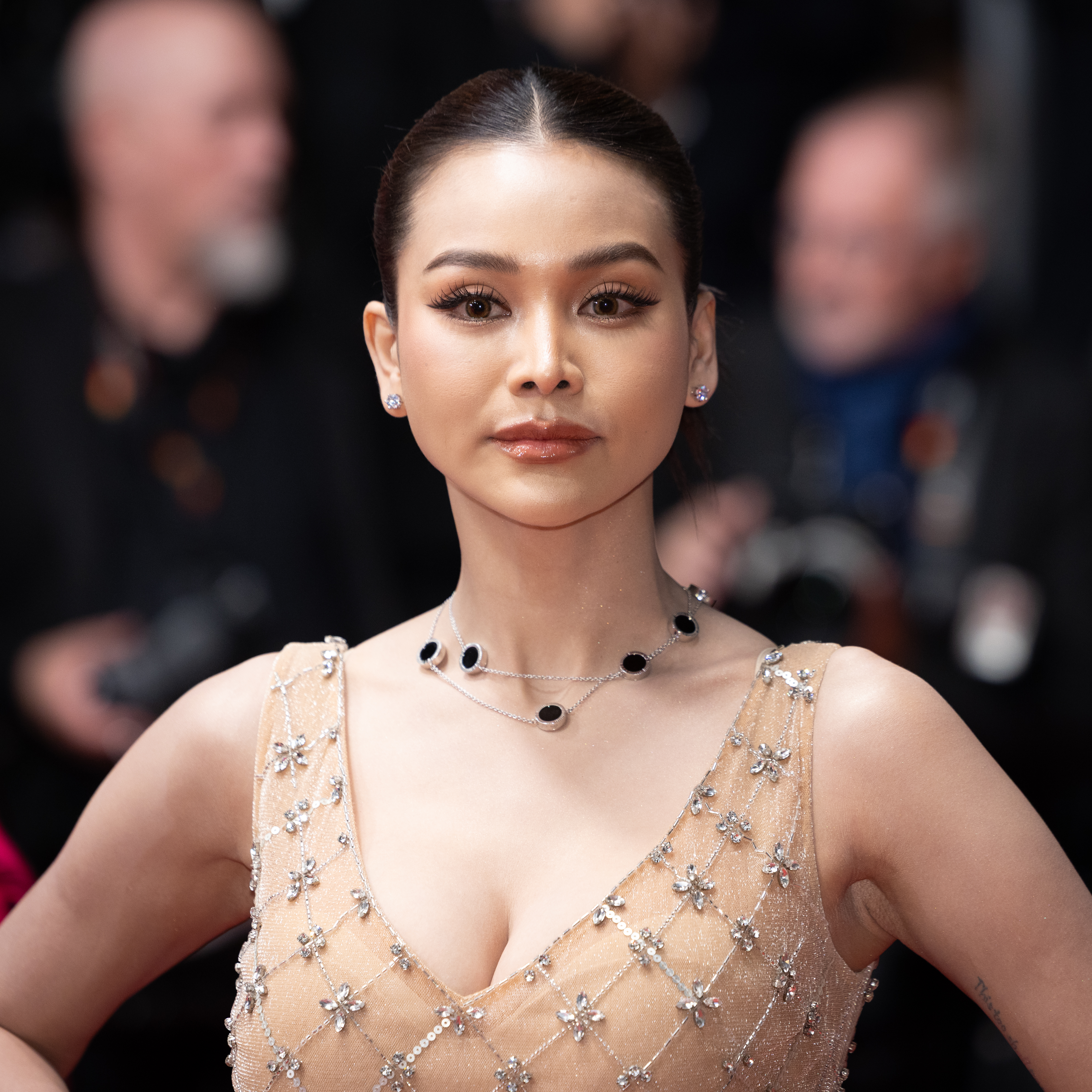
2022, Engfa Waraha, (Bangkok)

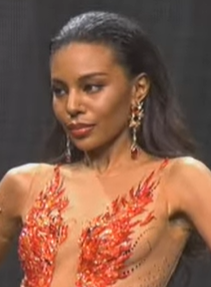
2021, Indy Johnson, (Pathum Thani)

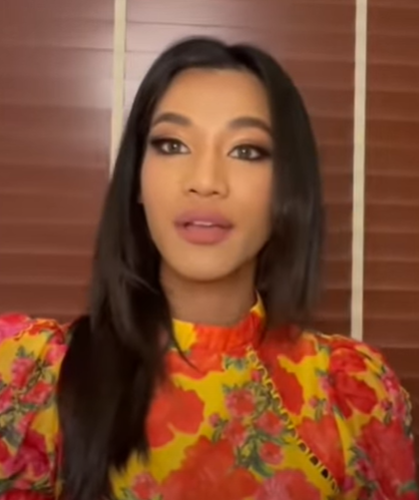
2020, Patcharaporn Chantarapadit, (Ranong)

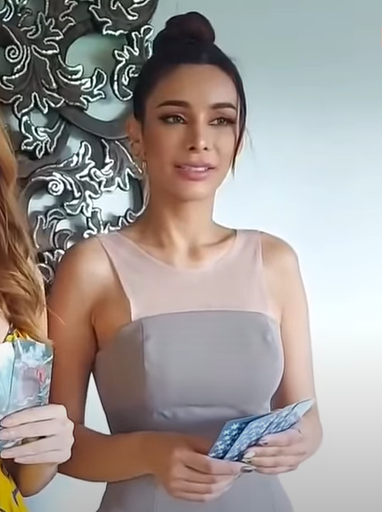
2019, Arayha Suparurk, (Nakhon Phanom)

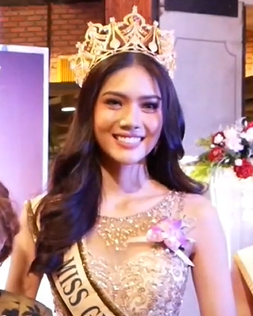
2018, Nam–Oey Chanaphan, (Phuket)

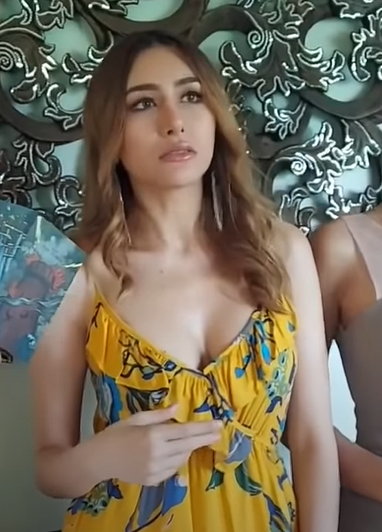
2017, Pamela Pasinetti, (Krabi)

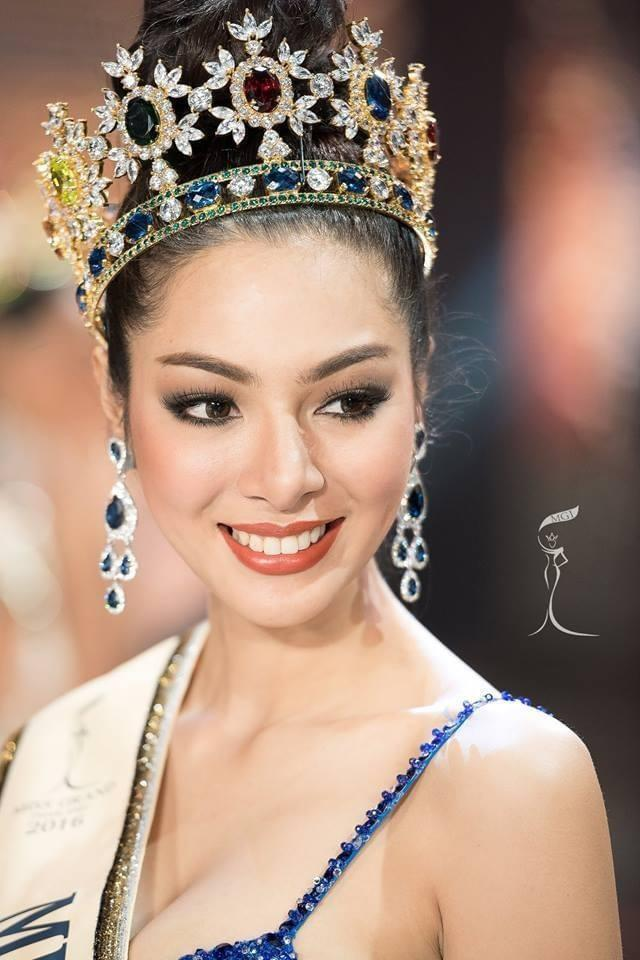
2016, Supaporn Malisorn, (Songkhla)

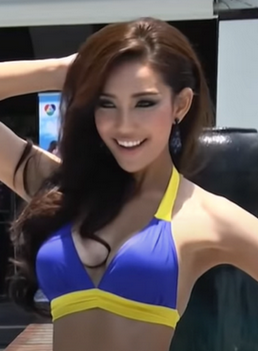
2015, Rattikorn Kunsom, (Songkhla)

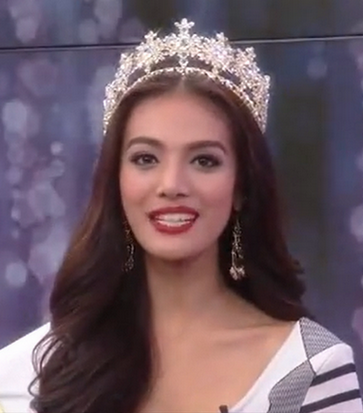
2014, Parapadsorn Vorrasirinda, (Nakhon Ratchasima)

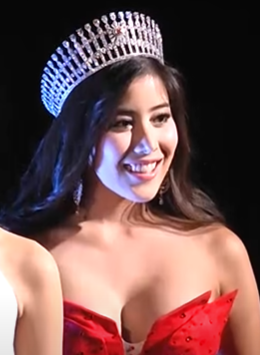
2013, Yada Theppanom, (Prachuap Khiri Khan)

== International competition ==
Current Franchises
Membership	Year
Miss Grand International	2013–present
Miss Tourism International	2014–present
Face of Beauty International	2019–present
Miss Chinese World	2017, 2021–present
The Miss Globe	2016–2019, 2022–present
Miss Aura International	2023-present
Miss Asia Pacific International	2024-present
Miss Tourism Queen of the Year International	2015–2017,2025-present
Former Franchises
Membership	Year
Miss Eco International	2017, 2021,2024-2026
Miss Earth	2014
Miss Supranational	2013–2016, 2025
Miss Intercontinental	2013–2022
Miss United Continents	2014, 2016–2019
Top Model of the World	2016–2017
Miss Tourism Metropolitan International	2016, 2019
Miss Landscapes International	2019
Miss South East Asia Tourism Ambassadress	2015
Miss Globe International	2013

Number of wins under Miss Grand Thailand
Pageant	Wins
Miss Tourism International	2
The Miss Globe	1
Miss Aura International	1
Face of Beauty International	1
Miss Tourism Metropolitan International	1
Miss Southeast Asia Tourism Ambassador	1
Miss Intercontinental	1

Usually, the Miss Grand Thailand finalists are granted the right to participate in various international contests affiliated with the organization. During 2013–2016, their placements had been being announced under the international pageant titles they acquired the right to participate. Nonetheless, after a dispute over franchise fees with the World Beauty Association S.A. of Miss Supranational pageant in 2017, the organization terminated its partnership with such an association, and the national placements have instead been announced as 1st–4th runners-up since then. Back in the inaugural edition, the placement was sequentially announced as Miss Globe Thailand, Miss Intercontinental Thailand, Miss Supranational Thailand, first runner-up, and the winner of Miss Grand Thailand. However, the position for Miss Globe Thailand and the 1st runner-up was respectively replaced by Miss Tourism Thailand and Miss Earth Thailand after the organization purchased the franchises in 2014. Later in 2015, the organizer lost the Miss Earth franchise, the vacant position was announced as the 1st runner-up instead, and the Miss Supranational Thailand title was later promoted to take over this position in 2016.

In 2014, Organize IQ Ltd., the organizer of the Miss Earth Thailand competition, filed a copyright infringement lawsuit against the Miss Grand Thailand Ltd. founder for violating the rights for such the contest. The plaintiff claimed the license to select a Thai representative for the Miss Earth from 2013 to 2017. Furthermore, ere the lawsuit action, the Organizer IQ Ltd. requested the defendant to show the evidence approving the license purchasing; however, the aforementioned legitimate demand was refused caused the plaintiff to take legal action against the Miss Grand Thailand Ltd. Originally, the Organizer IQ Co., Ltd. planned to arrange a press conference of the Miss Earth Thailand 2014 pageant on 5 August, and the coronation night was scheduled on 28 September, to elect the candidate for Miss Earth 2014 but unfortunately lost the franchise to Miss Grand Thailand Ltd. who elected Sasi Sintawee, the first runner-up Miss Grand Thailand 2014, to participate in the said international pageant.

The resignation of the finalists was observed in 2014, 2015, and 2017 editions; Ananya Mongkolthai, who has been crowned Miss Supranational Thailand in the 2014 edition, was forced to resign the title due to undisclosed health problems that caused the organization to select Parapadsorn Vorrasirinda, Miss Grand Thailand 2014, to instead compete in Miss Supranational 2014; in which she finished as the first runner-up. However, the reasons for such incidents in 2015 and 2017 were unrevealed.

Oftentimes, the Miss Grand Thailand Ltd. representatives qualified to the finalists round in the international pageants, for instance, three consecutive years as the runner-up at Miss United Continents pageant and obtained four runner-up titles in its sister contest – Miss Grand International, but rarely won the main title. The following are the highlights performance of Miss Grand Thailand titleholders in international pageants since its inception in 2013.

- One — Miss Intercontinental winner: Pataraporn Wang (2014)
- One — The Miss Globe winner: Chayathanus Saradatta (2025)
- Two — Miss Tourism International winners: Suphatra Kliangprom (2022) and Tia Li Taveepanichpan (2023)
- One — Miss Aura International winner: Ketwalee Plobdee (2023)
- One — Miss Tourism Metropolitan International winner: Amanda Obdam (2016)
- One — Miss Southeast Asia Tourism Ambassador winner: Yada Theppanom (2015)
- One — Face of Beauty International winner: Peerachada Khunrak (2019)

=== Current Franchises ===
Color keys

- : Declared as Winner
- : Ended as runner-up or Top 5/6 qualification
- : Ended as one of the Finalists
- : Ended as one of the Semi-finalists
- : Ended as special awards winner

==== Miss Grand International ====
Year	Representative's Name	Province	Title	Placement	Special Awards	Ref.
2026	Patthama Jitsawat	Chonburi	Miss Grand Thailand 2026	5th Runner-Up	Best National Costume; Miss Popular Vote; Pre-arrival voting; Grand Day Experience	
2025	Sarunrat Pueakpipat	Phuket	Miss Grand Thailand 2025	1st Runner-up	Best in National Costume; Best in Swimsuit; Pre-arrival Voting	
2024	Malin Chara-anan	Phuket	Miss Grand Thailand 2024	Top 20	Winner - Country's power of the year; Miss Beauty Skin; Pre-arrival Voting	
2023	Thaweeporn Phingchamrat	Chumphon	Miss Grand Thailand 2023	5th Runners-up	Best in Ao Dai	
2022	Engfa Waraha	Bangkok	Miss Grand Thailand 2022	1st Runner-up	Grand Voice Award; Best in National Costume; Pre-arrival Voting; 1st runner-up - Country's power of the year	
2021	Indy Johnson	Pathum Thani	Miss Grand Thailand 2021 (Appointed)	Unplaced	Best in Evening Gown; Lottery Prizes Event	
2020	Patcharaporn Chantarapadit	Ranong	Miss Grand Thailand 2020	Top 10	Best in National Costume; How to eat Thai food in 2-minute Challenge	
2019	Arayha Suparurk	Nakhon Phanom	Miss Grand Thailand 2019	2nd Runner-up	The Historic Crowns Fashion Show Gala by George Wittels	
2018	Nam–Oey Chanaphan	Phuket	Miss Grand Thailand 2018	Top 20	Best in Evening Gown; Pre-arrival Voting	
2017	Pamela Pasinetti	Krabi	Miss Grand Thailand 2017	Top 10	Miss Paradise Gave Heart Ace	
2016	Supaporn Malisorn	Songkhla	Miss Grand Thailand 2016	2nd Runner-up		
2015	Rattikorn Kunsom	Songkhla	Miss Grand Thailand 2015	4th Runner-up		
2014	Parapadsorn Vorrasirinda	Nakhon Ratchasima	Miss Grand Thailand 2014	Top 10	Best in Swimsuit	
2013	Yada Theppanom	Prachuap Khiri Khan	Miss Grand Thailand 2013	Top 20		

==== The Miss Globe ====
Year	Representative's Name	Province	Title	Placement	Special Awards	Ref.
2025	Chayathanus Saradatta	Khon Kaen	1st runner-up at Miss Grand Thailand 2025	Winner	People's Choice Award	
2024	Thansita Dilhokanansakul	Lampang	3rd runner-up at Miss Grand Thailand 2024	1st runner-up	Miss Talent Show	
2023	Pimjira Jaroenlak	Bangkok	2nd runner-up at Miss Grand Thailand 2023	Top 15		
2022	Tanawan Wigg	Kalasin	2nd runner-up at Miss Grand Thailand 2022	3rd Runner-up	1st Runner-up - Miss Bikini	
Did not compete between 2020-2021
2019	Sirirat Naubon	Ubon Ratchathani	Top 10 at Miss Grand Thailand 2019	Non-Finalist	Miss Dream Girl of the World; Miss Bikini (Grupo 2); 2nd Runner-up – Talent Show	
2018	Jiratchaya Sukinta	Nakhon Pathom	1st Runner-up of Miss Grand Thailand 2018	Non-Finalist		
2017	Chatchadaporn Kimakorn	Ratchaburi	1st Runner-up of Miss Grand Thailand 2016	Top 15		
2016	Pinicha Kitkasempongsa	Chonburi	3rd Runner-up of Miss Grand Thailand 2016	Top 10	Miss Popular Vote; Miss Elegance	

==== Miss Tourism International ====
Year	Representative's Name	Province	Title	Placement	Special Awards	Ref.
2026	Natthakitta Kerdkanchiroj	Saraburi	3rd Runner-up of Miss Grand Thailand 2026	TBA	TBA	
2025	Sasicha Duangket	Nakhon Phanom	Top 20 at Miss Grand Thailand 2024	5th Runner up: Dreamgirl of The Year International 2025/26	Miss Carlo Rino Trendy; Miss in Social Media	
2025	Khanaporn Phatthanaphan	Bangkok	4th Runner-up of Miss Grand Thailand 2025	Did not compete		
2024	Nattha Intasao	Mukdahan	Top 20 at Miss Grand Thailand 2024	1st Runner-up: Miss Tourism Queen of the Year International 2024/25	Miss Goodwill; Best in Talent	
2023	Tia Li Taveepanichpan	Phuket	1st Runner-up of Miss Grand Thailand 2023	Winner		
2022	Suphatra Kliangprom	Phrae	4th Runner-up of Miss Grand Thailand 2022	Winner	Miss Social Media	
2021	Juthamas Mekseree	Chiang Rai	3rd Runner-up of Miss Grand Thailand 2020	Non-Finalist		
2020	Patchaploy Rueandaluang	Nakhon Si Thammarat	2nd Runner-up of Miss Grand Thailand 2020	1st Runner-up: Miss Tourism Queen of the Year International 2020/21		
2019	Chompoonuch Puengpon	Phang Nga	4th Runner-up of Miss Grand Thailand 2019	5th Runner-up: Miss South East Asia Tourism Ambassador 2019/20	Miss D'swiss Beauty; Miss Sogo Trendscenter	
2018	Methawee Theeraleekul	Sa Kaeo	4th Runner-up of Miss Grand Thailand 2018	Non-Finalist	Miss Best Physique	
2017	Kamolrat Tanont	Sisaket	4th Runner-up of Miss Grand Thailand 2017	5th Runner-up: Miss South East Asia Tourism Ambassador 2017/18	Best in National Costume; Miss Secret Charm	
2016	Pinicha Kitkasempongsa	Chonburi	3rd Runner-up of Miss Grand Thailand 2016	Non-Finalist	Most Prolific in Social Media; Best in Evening Wear	
2014	Warangkanang Wutthayangkorn	Nakhon Sawan	4th Runner-up of Miss Grand Thailand 2014	1st Runner-up: Miss Tourism Queen of the Year International 2014/15	Beautiful Smile; Miss Focus Point Dazzling; Best Runway	

==== Face of Beauty International ====
Year	Representative's Name	Province	Title	Placement	Special Awards	Ref.
2026	Pitchayawi Yokoyama	Bangkok	5th Runner-up of Miss Grand Thailand 2026	Winner	Best in Swimsuit; Charity Ambassador; 1st Runner-up – Best in National Costume; 1st Runner-up –Best in Evening Gown	
2025	Suphanikka Nopparat	Chumphon	5th Runner-up of Miss Grand Thailand 2025	4th Runner-up	Best in Swimsuit; Best in Evening Gown; Eminent Luggage Group; Gozeob Group	
2024	Waranchana Radomlek	Khon Kaen	5th Runner-up of Miss Grand Thailand 2022	4th Runner-up	Fame Hall Garden Hotel Ambassadress	
2023	Athita Payak	Chiang Mai	5th Runner-up of Miss Grand Thailand 2022	1st Runner-up	Miss Photogenic; Best in Swimsuit; People's Choice; Mister DIY Choice	
Due to the impact of COVID-19 pandemic, no pageant in 2020-2022
2019	Peerachada Khunrak	Nan	1st Runner-up of Miss Grand Thailand 2019	Winner	Best in Swimsuit; Miss APC Smile; People's Choice	

==== Miss Asia Pacific International ====
Year	Representative's Name	Province	Title	Placement	Special Awards	Ref.
2025	Bawonrat Maneerat	Sa Kaeo	5th Runner-up of Miss Grand Thailand 2025	2nd Runner-up	Best National Costume; Miss Cindyrelladrip; Miss Teen Station	
2024	Kanyaphatsaphon Rungrueang	Pathum Thani	1st Runner-up of Miss Grand Thailand 2024	Top 10	People’s Choice Award; Best in Evening Gown; Miss Eventologie	

==== Miss Aura International ====
Year	Representative's Name	Province	Title	Placement	Special Awards	Ref.
2026	Assuntina Chusak	Trat	5th Runner-up of Miss Grand Thailand 2026	Top 11		
2025	Ilin Nabsuk	Kalasin	5th Runner-up of Miss Grand Thailand 2025	3rd runner-up		
2024	Kittiyaporn Fungmee	Chumphon	2nd Runner-up of Miss Grand Thailand 2024	Top 11	Best in National Costume	
2023	Ketwalee Phobdee	Phrae	4th Runner-up of Miss Grand Thailand 2023	Winner		

==== Miss Chinese World ====
Year	Representative's Name	Province	Title	Placement	Special Awards	Ref.
2026	Phatcharamon Thepraksa	Chachoengsao	5th Runner-up of Miss Grand Thailand 2026	1st Runner-up	TOYM Dream Ambassador	
2023	Parithaniya Sarinsiyaporn	Nakhon Pathom	Contestant at Miss Grand Thailand 2022	Top 5	Miss Carlo Rino Trendy Best Fashion	
2023	Kittiyaporn Lanont	Sisaket	Top 20 at Miss Grand Thailand 2022	Non-Finalist	Miss Symposium Elegant (Best Elegant Charm)	
2021	Nutnicha Srithongsuk	Mukdahan	4th Runner-up of Miss Grand Thailand 2020	Top 10	Miss Dreven Capital Congeniality	
2017	Prapaporn Matip	Phayao	Contestant at Miss Grand Thailand 2016	Top 5		

=== Past Franchises ===
Color keys

- : Declared as Winner
- : Ended as runner-up or Top 5/6 qualification
- : Ended as one of the Finalists
- : Ended as one of the Semi-finalists
- : Ended as special awards winner

==== Miss Eco International ====
Year	Representative's Name	Province	Title	Placement	Special Awards	Ref.
2026	Jessica Niinimaa	Phrae	5th Runner-up of Miss Grand Thailand 2026	Top 21	Miss Eco Int Elegant	
2025	Natthakan Kunchayawanut	Chonburi	Top 20 at Miss Grand Thailand 2024	Top 11		
2024	Kodchakorn Kontrakoon	Nong Bua Lamphu	5th Runner-up of Miss Grand Thailand 2023	Top 21	Miss Eco Top Model	
2021	Juthamas Mekseree	Chiang Rai	3rd Runner-up of Miss Grand Thailand 2020	Top 10	Miss Eco Top Model; 1st Runner-up – Best in Resort Wear; 2nd Runner-up – Best in National Costume	
Due to the impact of COVID-19 pandemic, no pageant in 2020
2017	Chanita Juntanetr	Ubon Ratchathani	Top 10 at Miss Grand Thailand 2016	Top 20	Best Smile; (silver) Miss Eco Dress	

==== Miss Earth ====
Year	Representative's Name	Province	Title	Placement	Special Awards	Ref.
2014	Sasi Sintawee	Songkhla	1st Runner-up of Miss Grand Thailand 2014	Top 16	4 Special Awards: Eco-Beauty Video; (gold) Cocktail Wear (Group 3); (gold) Swimsuit (Group 3); (silver) Resort Wear (Group 3)	

==== Miss Supranational ====
Year	Representative's Name	Province	Title	Placement	Special Awards	Ref.
2025	Michelle Behrmann	Phatthalung	5th Runner-up of Miss Grand Thailand 2025	Non-Finalist		
2016	Chatchadaporn Kimakorn	Ratchaburi	1st Runner-up of Miss Grand Thailand 2016	Non-Finalist: Top 35 Close Shots (28th Place)		
2015	Tharathip Sukdharunpatr	Roi Et	1st Runner-up of Miss Grand Thailand 2015	Non-Finalist		
2014	Parapadsorn Vorrasirinda	Nakhon Ratchasima	Miss Grand Thailand 2014	1st Runner-up		
2014	Ananya Mongkolthai	Bangkok	2nd Runner-up of Miss Grand Thailand 2014	Did not compete		
2013	Thanyaporn Srisen	Nakhon Si Thammarat	1st Runner-up of Miss Grand Thailand 2013	Top 20		

==== Miss Intercontinental ====
Year	Representative's Name	Province	Title	Placement	Special Awards	Ref.
2023	Kodchakorn Kontrakoon	Nong Bua Lamphu	5th Runner-up of Miss Grand Thailand 2023	Did not compete		
2022	Amanda Jensen	Phuket	1st Runner-up of Miss Grand Thailand 2022	Top 20		
2021	Nutnicha Srithongsuk	Mukdahan	4th Runner-up of Miss Grand Thailand 2020	Top 20		
Due to the impact of COVID-19 pandemic, no pageant in 2020
2019	Naruemon Kampan	Chiang Mai	2nd Runner-up of Miss Grand Thailand 2019	2nd Runner-up	Miss Intercontinental Asia & Oceania	
2018	Ingchanok Prasart	Sakon Nakhon	2nd Runner-up of Miss Grand Thailand 2018	Top 20	1st Runner-up – Miss Playa Calatagan	
2017	Sarucha Nilchan	Prachuap Khiri Khan	2nd Runner-up of Miss Grand Thailand 2017	Non-Finalist	2nd Runner-up – Best in National Costume	
2016	Atitaya Khunnalapat	Sing Buri	2nd Runner-up of Miss Grand Thailand 2016	Top 15	Best in National Costume	
2015	Boonyanee Sungpirom	Nakhon Pathom	2nd Runner-up of Miss Grand Thailand 2015	Top 17	Miss Photogenic; 2nd Runner-up – Best in Evening Gown	
2014	Patraporn Wang	Bangkok	3rd Runner-up of Miss Grand Thailand 2014	Winner	Miss Intercontinental Asia & Oceania	
2013	Keeratika Sawangjaeng	Phitsanulok	3rd Runner-up of Miss Grand Thailand 2013	Top 15		

==== Miss United Continents ====
Year	Representative's Name	Province	Title	Placement	Special Awards	Ref.
Due to the impact of COVID-19 pandemic, no pageant in 2020-2021
2019	Maneerat Daengprasert	Trat	3rd Runner-up of Miss Grand Thailand 2019	3rd Runner-up	1st Runner-up – Best in National Costume	
2018	Nantapak Kraiha	Buriram	3rd Runner-up of Miss Grand Thailand 2018	5th Runner-up	Miss Photogenic	
2017	Thaweeporn Prinkchumrud	Chanthaburi	3rd Runner-up of Miss Grand Thailand 2017	3rd Runner-up	Miss Photogenic; Best in National Costume	
2016	Boonyanee Sungpirom	Nakhon Pathom	2nd Runner-up of Miss Grand Thailand 2015	Top 10		
2014	Nuralaila Binmamah	Narathiwat	Contestant at Miss Grand Thailand 2014	Non-Finalist		

==== Miss Tourism Queen of the Year International ====
Year	Representative's Name	Province	Title	Placement	Special Awards	Ref.
2025	Sasicha Duangket	Nakhon Phanom	Top 20 at Miss Grand Thailand 2024	Pageant was cancelled		
2017	Nararin Pimpisarn	Sa Kaeo	Top 12 at Miss Grand Thailand 2017	Non-Finalist	Best in National Costume	
2016	Kancharat Tantirittiporn	Mae Hong Son	Contestant at Miss Grand Thailand 2016	Non-Finalist		
2015	Chonthicha Imjunya	Chonburi	3rd Runner-up of Miss Grand Thailand 2015	Non-Finalist	Best Social Media	

==== Miss Tourism Metropolitan International ====
Year	Representative's Name	Province	Title	Placement	Special Awards	Ref.
2019	Nutthida Puengnum	Ranong	Contestant at Miss Grand Thailand 2019	Non-Finalist	Best in Sport Wear	
2016	Amanda Obdam	Phuket	Top 10 at Miss Grand Thailand 2016	Winner	Miss Photogenic	

==== Miss South East Asia Tourism Ambassadress ====
Year	Representative's Name	Province	Title	Placement	Special Awards	Ref.
2015	Yada Theppanom	Prachuap Khiri Khan	Miss Grand Thailand 2013	Winner		
2015	Kobkul Bunreaung	Khon Kaen	Contestant at Miss Grand Thailand 2015	Non-Finalist		

==== Miss Landscapes International ====
Year	Representative's Name	Province	Title	Placement	Special Awards	Ref.
2019	Chinthita Wilailak	Nan	Top 20 at Miss Grand Thailand 2018	Non-Finalist		

==== Top Model of the World ====
Year	Representative's Name	Province	Title	Placement	Special Awards	Ref.
2017	Boonyanee Sungpirom	Nakhon Pathom	2nd Runner-up of Miss Grand Thailand 2015	Top 10		
2016	Anchana Archklom	Phetchaburi	4th Runner-up of Miss Grand Thailand 2016	4th Runner-up		

==== Miss Globe International ====
Year	Representative's Name	Province	Title	Placement	Special Awards	Ref.
2013	Sopapan Viroonmas	Phuket	4th Runner-up of Miss Grand Thailand 2013	Pageant was cancelled		

== Controversies ==
=== Regional dethronement and license termination ===
Since the pageant franchise was distributed to the local organizer in 2016, several incidents of provincial champion dethronement and license cessation have been observed, especially in the first few years of an allotment. It arose from the meticulous regulations of Miss Grand Thailand Ltd., the provincial title holders are not permitted to participate in any beauty pageants throughout the year of reign unless with the organization's consent. In case of regulatory violations, the title would be revoked. Moreover, if the investigation found the director's involvement in such an offense or failure to comply with the contract-specified terms and conditions, the provincial licenses might additionally be terminated.

In 2017, the representative of Satun Province, one of the favorite contenders, was de-titled after participating in another local pageant during her reign, she contended that such a decision was approved by the provincial director; as a result, the license was also ceased. However, the provincial pageant was later held again under the direction of a new franchise holder to select a new representative for the national contest. The candidate from Surin province was dethroned due to the aforementioned circumstances as well. In addition, the organization's investigation found a corrupted issue in the regional pageant of Samut Sakhon Province. Therefore, the competition result was not authenticated and the license was transferred to another organizer, who held the substituted contest to elect the replacement later in Bangkok. Following the national contest completion, the Phatthalung titleholder has subsequently been removed from the provincial title in late November as a result of taking part in the Miss International 2017 pageant in Japan without informing the organization. As well, the candidates from Ang Thong, Amnat Charoen, Nong Khai, Phang Nga, and Mae Hong Son were also relieved from the title after taking part in other local pageants during their reign.

In the 2018 season, two provincial title holders were dismissed and received a permanent prohibition to engage in any exhibition related to Miss Grand Thailand Ltd. when the representatives of Yasothon and Lampang province participated in other contests without completing the year of reign. There have been no more dethronements by the central organizer since then.

== See also ==
- Miss Earth Thailand
- Miss Supranational Thailand
- List of beauty pageants
