= Miss Grand Lopburi =

Provincial pageant in Lopburi, Thailand

Miss Grand ฺLopburi มิสแกรนด์ลพบุรี
- Formation: April 29, 2016; 9 years ago
- Founder: Thuanthong Nokchan
- Type: Beauty pageant
- Headquarters: Lopburi
- Location: Thailand
- Official language: Thai
- Provincial Director: Thuanthong Nokchan (2016–present)
- Affiliations: Miss Grand Thailand

Summary result of Lopburi representatives at Miss Grand Thailand
| Placement | Number(s) |
|---|---|
| Winner | 0 |
| 1st runner-up | 0 |
| 2nd runner-up | 0 |
| 3rd runner-up | 0 |
| 4th runner-up | 0 |
| Top 10/11/12 | 1 |
| Top 20/21 | 0 |
| Unplaced | 7 |

Miss Grand Lopburi (Thai: มิสแกรนด์ลพบุรี) is a Thai provincial beauty pageant which selects a representative from Lopburi province to the Miss Grand Thailand national competition. It was founded in 2016 by an event organizer Thuanthong Nokchan (ทวนทอง นกจั่น).

Lopburi representatives have yet to win the Miss Grand Thailand title. The highest placement and only they obtained was in the top 10 finalists, achieved in 2023 by Thantawan Jittrilak.

== History ==
In 2016, after Miss Grand Thailand began franchising the provincial competitions to individual organizers, who would name seventy-seven provincial titleholders to compete in the national pageant, the license for Lopburi province was granted to a local organizer Thuanthong Nokchan, who was also the licensee for that year's Miss Grand Ang Thong. Nokchan organized the first Miss Grand Lopburi in parallel with the Miss Grand Ang Thong contest on April 29, 2016, in Sing Buri province, and named Patcharamai Boonlertkul the first Miss Grand Lopburi.

The pageant was skipped once; in 2021, due to the COVID-19 pandemic in Thailand, the national organizer was unable to organize the national event, and the country representative for the international tournament was appointed instead.

Winner gallery

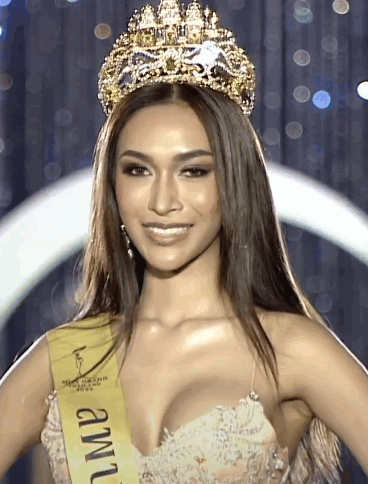
Niratcha Namwatcharasopit,
Miss Grand Lopburi 2022

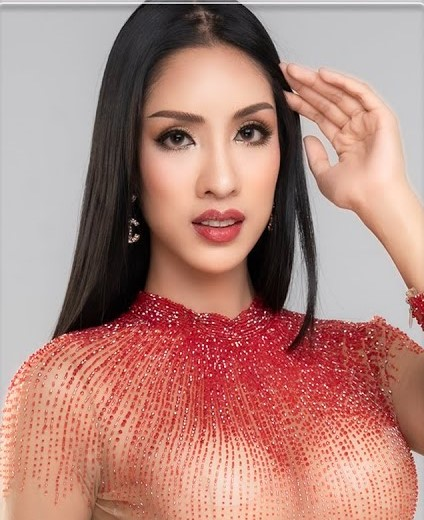
Tantawan Jitteelak,
Miss Grand Lopburi 2023

== Editions ==
The following table details Miss Grand Lopburi's annual editions since 2016.

| Edition | Date | Final venue | Entrants | Winner | Ref. |
|---|---|---|---|---|---|
| 1st (Note: Organized as an inter-provincial pageant with the Miss Grand Ang Thong contest.) | April 29, 2016 | Paiboon Kaiyang Restaurant, Mueang Sing Buri, Sing Buri | 10 | Patcharamai Boonlertkul | |
| 2nd | February 18, 2017 | Robinson Lifestyle Lopburi, Mueang Lop Buri, Lopburi | 13 | Watcharaporn Phothikasikorn | |
| 3rd | March 24, 2018 | Robinson Lifestyle Lopburi, Mueang Lop Buri, Lopburi | 20 | Natthicha Kongnim | |
| 4th | February 14, 2019 | King Narai's Palace, Mueang Lop Buri, Lopburi | 14 | Natthida Puangkasem | |
| 5th | July 19, 2020 | Robinson Lifestyle Lopburi, Mueang Lop Buri, Lopburi | 19 | Sawitree Fonthong | |
| 6th (Note: Organized as an inter-provincial pageant with the Miss Grand Phra Nakhon Si Ayutthaya contest.) | February 20, 2022 | Central Ayutthaya, Phra Nakhon Si Ayutthaya | 15 | Niratcha Namwatcharasophit | |
| 7th | November 27, 2022 | Big C Lopburi, Mueang Lop Buri, Lopburi | 13 | Thantawan Jittrilak | |
| 8th | December 17, 2023 | Big C Lopburi, Mueang Lop Buri, Lopburi | 11 | Nanthanaporn Deesamrong | |
| 9th | September 29, 2024 | YSW Hotel Lopburi, Mueang Lop Buri, Lopburi | 13 | Phattharanit Panchan | |

== National competition ==
The following is a list of Lopburi representatives who competed at the Miss Grand Thailand pageant.

| Year | Representative | | Original provincial title | Placement at Miss Grand Thailand | Provincial director | Ref. |
| Year | Romanized name | Thai name | Original provincial title | Placement at Miss Grand Thailand | Provincial director | Ref. |
|---|---|---|---|---|---|---|
| 2016 | Patcharamai Boonlertkul | พัชรมัย บุญเลิศกุล | Miss Grand Lopburi 2016 | Unplaced | Thuanthong Nokchan | |
| 2017 | Watcharaporn Phothikasikorn | วัชราภรณ์ โพธิกสิกร | Miss Grand Lopburi 2017 | Unplaced | Thuanthong Nokchan | |
| 2018 | Natthicha Kongnim | ณัฐธิชา คงนิ่ม | Miss Grand Lopburi 2018 | Unplaced | Thuanthong Nokchan | |
| 2019 | Natthida Puangkasem | ณัฐธิดา พวงเกษม | Miss Grand Lopburi 2019 | Unplaced | Thuanthong Nokchan | |
| 2020 | Sawitree Fonthong | สาวิตรี ฝนทอง | Miss Grand Lopburi 2020 | Unplaced | Thuanthong Nokchan | |
| 2021 | No national pageant due to the COVID-19 pandemic. | | | | | |
| 2022 | Niratcha Namwatcharasophit | นิรัชชา นามวัชระโสพิศ | Miss Grand Lopburi 2022 | Unplaced | Thuanthong Nokchan | |
| 2023 | Tantawan Jittrilak | ทานตะวัน จิตรีลักษณ์ | Miss Grand Lopburi 2023 | 5th runner-up | Thuanthong Nokchan | |
| 2024 | Nanthanaporn Deesamrong | นันทนาภรณ์ ดีสำโรง | Miss Grand Lopburi 2024 | Unplaced | Thuanthong Nokchan | |
| 2025 | Phattharanit Panchan | ภัทรานิษฐ์ แป้นจันทร์ | Miss Grand Lopburi 2025 | Unplaced | Thuanthong Nokchan | |
