= Miss Grand Chanthaburi =

Provincial pageant in Chanthaburi, Thailand

Miss Grand Chanthaburi มิสแกรนด์จันทบุรี
- Formation: April 23, 2016; 10 years ago
- Founder: Thanapat Sae-Ueng
- Type: Beauty pageant
- Headquarters: Chanthaburi
- Location: Thailand
- Official language: Thai
- Provincial Director: Thannicha Singhngern(2024)
- Affiliations: Miss Grand Thailand

Summary result of Chanthaburi representatives at Miss Grand Thailand
Placement	Number(s)
Winner	0
1st runner-up	0
2nd runner-up	0
3rd runner-up	1
4th runner-up	0
Top 10/11/12	0
Top 20/21	2
Unplaced	6

Miss Grand Chanthaburi (Thai: มิสแกรนด์จันทบุรี) is a Thai provincial beauty pageant which selects a representative from Chanthaburi province to the Miss Grand Thailand national competition. It was founded in 2016 by a local organizer, Thanapat Sae-Ueng (ธนภัทร แซ่อึ้ง).

Chanthaburi representatives have yet to win the Miss Grand Thailand title. The highest placement they obtained in the contest was the third runner-up, won in 2017 by Thaweeporn Phingchamrat.

== History ==
In 2016, after Miss Grand Thailand began franchising the provincial competitions to individual organizers, who would name seventy-seven provincial titleholders to compete in the national pageant. The license for Chanthaburi province was granted to Thanapat Sae-Ueng, who organized the first Miss Grand Chanthaburi contest on April 23, 2016, in Mueang Chanthaburi district and named a model Jaruwan Rerkwichian the winner. Thongpan relinquished the license in 2020.

Occasionally, the pageant was co-organized with other provincial pageants; with Miss Grand Trat – Rayong in 2017 and 2020, and with Miss Grand Trat in 2018 and 2022.

The pageant was skipped once; in 2021, due to the COVID-19 pandemic in Thailand, the national organizer was unable to organize the national event, and the country representative for the international tournament was appointed instead.

Winner gallery

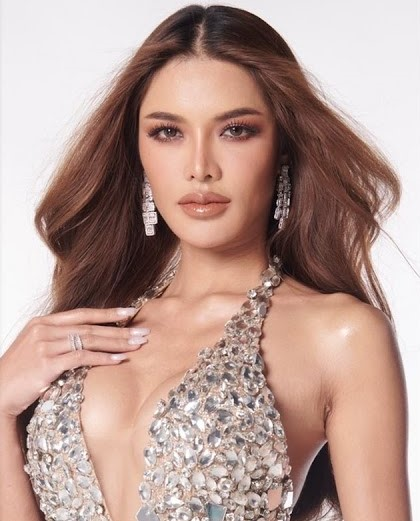
Thaweeporn Phingchamrat,
Miss Grand Chanthaburi 2017

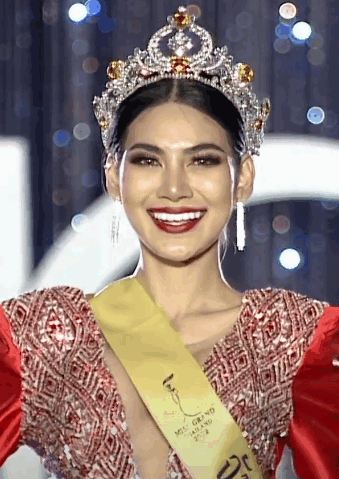
Warintorn Phupadrae,
Miss Grand Chanthaburi 2022

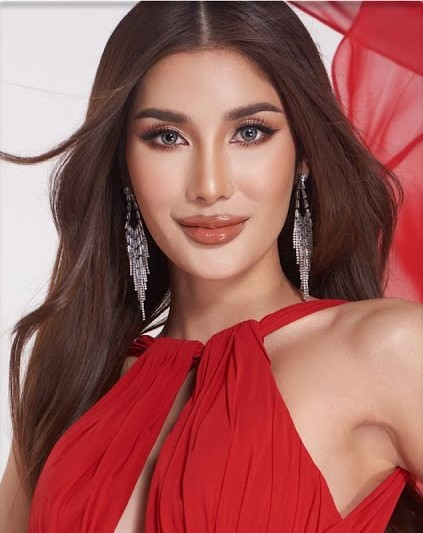
Tamita Anusin,
Miss Grand Chanthaburi 2023

== Editions ==
The following table details Miss Grand Chanthaburi's annual editions since 2016.

Edition	Date	Final venue	Entrants	Winner	Ref.
1st	April 23, 2016	Maneechan Resort, Mueang Chanthaburi, Chanthaburi	11	Jaruwan Rerkwichian	
2nd (Note: Organized an as inter-provincial pageant with the Miss Grand Trat and Miss Grand Rayong.)	April 1, 2017	New Travel Lodge Hotel, Mueang Chanthaburi, Chanthaburi	16	Thaweeporn Phingchamrat	
3rd (Note: Organized an as inter-provincial pageant with the Miss Grand Trat.)	April 31, 2018	New Travel Lodge Hotel, Mueang Chanthaburi, Chanthaburi	8	Naphatlada Dokpuang	
4th	May 3, 2019	Chanthaburi Gem and Jewelry Promotion Center, Mueang Chanthaburi	8	Warisara Phatthanasoon	
5th	August 15, 2020	Ploenta Garden & Restaurant, Mueang Rayong, Rayong	11	Manthaka Wongkham	
6th	February 16, 2022	VARAVELA Garden Hall, Bueng Kum, Bangkok	13	Warintorn Phuphat-rae	
7th	October 1, 2022	Central Chanthaburi, Mueang Chanthaburi, Chanthaburi	12	Tamita Anusin	
8th	October 23, 2023	Central Chanthaburi, Mueang Chanthaburi, Chanthaburi	7	Pitthiyaphon Phongsawat	
9th	January 15, 2025	Central Chanthaburi, Mueang Chanthaburi, Chanthaburi	10	Nattamon Kaenkrathok	

== National competition ==
The following is a list of Chanthaburi representatives who competed at the Miss Grand Thailand pageant.

Year	Representative		Original provincial title	Placement at Miss Grand Thailand	Provincial director	Ref.
Year	Romanized name	Thai name	Original provincial title	Placement at Miss Grand Thailand	Provincial director	Ref.
2016	Jaruwan Rerkwichian	จารุวรรณ ฤกษ์วิเชียร	Miss Grand Chanthaburi 2016	Unplaced	Thanapat Sae-Ueng	
2017	Thaweeporn Phingchamrat	ทวีพร พริ้งจำรัส	Miss Grand Chanthaburi 2017	3rd runner-up	Thanapat Sae-Ueng	
2018	Naphatlada Dokpuang	ณภัทรลดา ดอกพวง	Miss Grand Chanthaburi 2018	Top 20	Thanapat Sae-Ueng	
2019	Warisara Phatthanasoon	วริศรา พัฒนาศูร	Miss Grand Chanthaburi 2019	Top 20	Thanapat Sae-Ueng	
2020	Manthaka Wongkham	มัณฑกา วงคำ	Miss Grand Chanthaburi 2020	Unplaced	Punnatth Dechabun	
2021	No national pageant due to the COVID-19 pandemic.					
2022	Warintorn Phuphat-rae	วรินทร ภูผาดแร่	Miss Grand Chanthaburi 2022	Unplaced	Parattakorn Poonphan	
2023	Tamita Anusin	ทมิตา อนุศิลป์	Miss Grand Chanthaburi 2023	Unplaced	Anne Swk (alias)	
2024	Pitthiyaphon Phongsawat	พิทฐิยาภรณ์ พงษ์สวัสดิ์	Miss Grand Chanthaburi 2024	Unplaced	Thannicha Singhngern	
2025	Nattamon Kaenkrathok		Miss Grand Chanthaburi 2025	Unplaced		
