= Miss Grand Trat =

Provincial pageant in Trat, Thailand

Miss Grand Trat มิสแกรนด์ตราด
- Formation: May 17, 2016; 10 years ago
- Founder: Chamreon Kangkasri
- Type: Beauty pageant
- Headquarters: Trat
- Location: Thailand
- Official language: Thai
- Provincial Directors: Kritsakorn Chaengnet & Jutharat Plianphueng (2023–present)
- Affiliations: Miss Grand Thailand

Summary result of Trat representatives at Miss Grand Thailand
Placement	Number(s)
Winner	0
1st runner-up	0
2nd runner-up	0
3rd runner-up	1
4th runner-up	0
Top 10/11/12	0
Top 20/21	0
Unplaced	7

Miss Grand Trat (Thai: มิสแกรนด์ตราด) is a Thai provincial beauty pageant which selects a representative from Trat province to the Miss Grand Thailand national competition. It was founded in 2016 by a university teacher, Chamreon Kangkasri (จำเริญ คังคะศรี).

Trat representatives have yet to win the Miss Grand Thailand title. The highest and only placement they obtained in the contest was the 3rd runner-up, achieved in 2019 by Maneerat Daengprasert.

== History ==
In 2016, after Miss Grand Thailand began franchising the provincial competitions to individual organizers, who would name seventy-seven provincial titleholders to compete in the national pageant. The license for Trat province was granted to a university teacher, Chamreon Kangkasri, who organized the first Miss Grand Trat contest on May 17, 2016, in Koh Chang and named a model Jaruwan Rerkwichian the winner. Kangkasri relinquished the license to Thanapat Sae-Ueng the following year.

Occasionally, the pageant was co-organized with other provincial pageants; with Miss Grand Chanthaburi – Rayong in 2017 and 2020, and with Miss Grand Chanthaburi in 2018 and 2022.

The pageant was skipped once; in 2021, due to the COVID-19 pandemic in Thailand, the national organizer was unable to organize the national event, and the country representative for the international tournament was appointed instead.

Winner gallery

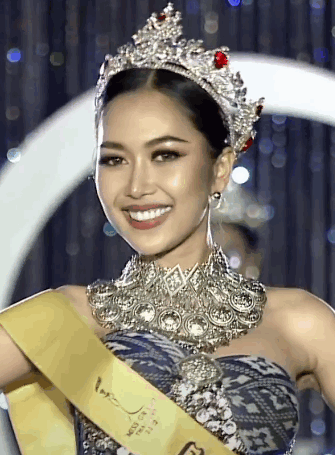
Ploypailin Worapong,
Miss Grand Trat 2022

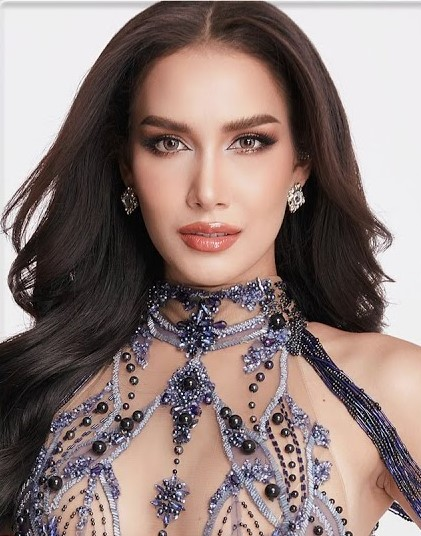
Jennifer Gallemaert,
Miss Grand Trat 2023

== Editions ==
The following table details Miss Grand Trat's annual editions since 2016.

Edition	Date	Final venue	Entrants	Winner	Ref.
1st	May 17, 2016	Kacha Resort & Spa, Koh Chang, Trat	9	Patcharamai Kheawlek	
2nd (Note: Organized an as inter-provincial pageant with the Miss Grand Chanthaburi and Miss Grand Rayong.)	April 1, 2017	New Travel Lodge Hotel, Mueang Chanthaburi, Chanthaburi	16	Paphasara Makkunchorn	
3rd (Note: Organized an as inter-provincial pageant with the Miss Grand Chanthaburi.)	April 31, 2018	New Travel Lodge Hotel, Mueang Chanthaburi, Chanthaburi	8	Karina Muller	
4th	May 11, 2019	De Veranio Resort, Khlong Yai, Trat	14	Maneerat Daengprasert	
5th	August 15, 2020	Ploenta Garden & Restaurant, Mueang Rayong, Rayong	11	Anusorn Panya	
6th	February 16, 2022	VARAVELA Garden Hall, Bueng Kum, Bangkok	13	Ploypailin Worawong	
7th	December 11, 2022	Trat Provincial Administrative Organization Auditorium, Mueang Trat	18	Jennifer Gallemaert	
8th	November 14, 2023	Trat Provincial Administrative Organization Auditorium, Mueang Trat	14	Kamonchanok Panyana	
9th	December 10, 2024	Trat Provincial Administrative Organization Auditorium, Mueang Trat	13	Sopida Bussarakham	

== National competition ==
The following is a list of Trat representatives who competed at the Miss Grand Thailand pageant.

Year	Representative		Original provincial title	Placement at Miss Grand Thailand	Provincial director	Ref.
Year	Romanized name	Thai name	Original provincial title	Placement at Miss Grand Thailand	Provincial director	Ref.
2016	Patcharamai Kheawlek	พัชรมัย เขียวเล็ก	Miss Grand Trat 2016	Unplaced	Chamreon Kangkasri	
2017	Paphasara Makkunchorn	ปภัสรา มากกุญชร	Miss Grand Trat 2017	Unplaced	Thanapat Sae-Ueng	
2018	Karina Muller	คาริน่า มูลเลอร์	Miss Grand Trat 2018	Unplaced	Thanapat Sae-Ueng	
2019	Maneerat Daengprasert	มณีรัตน์ แดงประเสริฐ	Miss Grand Trat 2019	3rd runner-up	Kasididet Chaisiri	
2020	Anusorn Panya	อนุสรา ปัญญา	Miss Grand Trat 2020	Unplaced	Punnatth Dechabun	
2021	No national pageant due to the COVID-19 pandemic.					
2022	Ploypailin Worawong	พลอยไพลิน วรวงษ์	Miss Grand Trat 2022	Unplaced	Parattakorn Poonphan	
2023	Jennifer Gallemaert	เจนนิเฟอร์ กัลเลอมาร์ท	Miss Grand Trat 2023	Unplaced	Kritsakorn Chaengnet & Jutharat Plianphueng	
2024	Kamonchanok Panyana	กมลชนก ปัญญานะ	Miss Grand Trat 2024	Unplaced	Kritsakorn Chaengnet & Jutharat Plianphueng	
2025	Sopida Bussarakham	โสภิดา บุษราคัม	Miss Grand Trat 2025	Unplaced	Kritsakorn Chaengnet & Jutharat Plianphueng	
2026	Assuntina Chusa	อซุนทีน่า ชูศักดิ์	Miss Grand Trat 2026	5th Runners-Up	Klanarong Kumsawang	
