= Miss Grand Chai Nat =

Provincial pageant in Chai Nat, Thailand

Miss Grand Chai Nat มิสแกรนด์ชัยนาท
- Formation: May 2, 2017; 9 years ago
- Founder: Chalermchai Innoi
- Type: Beauty pageant
- Headquarters: Chai Nat
- Location: Thailand
- Official language: Thai
- Provincial Director: Chatnapat Chittraratsenee (2025–present)
- Affiliations: Miss Grand Thailand

Summary result of Chai Nat representatives at Miss Grand Thailand
| Placement | Number(s) |
|---|---|
| Winner | 0 |
| 1st runner-up | 0 |
| 2nd runner-up | 0 |
| 3rd runner-up | 0 |
| 4th runner-up | 0 |
| Top 10/11/12 | 1 |
| Top 20/21 | 2 |
| Unplaced | 6 |

Miss Grand Chai Nat (Thai: มิสแกรนด์ชัยนาท) is a Thai provincial beauty pageant which selects a representative from Chai Nat province to the Miss Grand Thailand national competition. It was founded in 2017 by an entrepreneur Chalermchai Innoi (เฉลิมชัย อินน้อย).

Chai Nat representatives have yet to win the Miss Grand Thailand title. The highest placement they obtained in the contest was in the fifth runners-up (Top 10), won in 2024 by Phonphak Warasophonpakdee.

== History ==
In 2016, after Miss Grand Thailand began franchising the provincial competitions to individual organizers, who would name seventy-seven provincial titleholders to compete in the national pageant. A model Walulee Duangwana was assigned to represent the Chai Nat province in that year's national contest. Later in 2017, the license was transferred to television personality, Chalermchai Innoi, also known as Lexy Khayee Dara (เล็กซ์ซี่ ขยี้ดารา). Innoi organized the first Miss Grand Chai Nat in parallel with the Miss Grand Ang Thong and Miss Grand Sing Buri contests on May 2, 2017, in Mueang Sing Buri, and named Natnicha Khamsamran Miss Grand Chai Nat.

In addition to the 2017 edition, the contest was occasionally then co-organized with other provincial pageants, including Miss Grand Kanchanaburi–Suphan Buri in 2018, Miss Grand Sing Buri in 2019 and 2022, and Miss Grand Prachinburi in 2023. It was a stand-alone pageant only in 2020, 2024, and 2025.

The pageant was skipped once; in 2021, due to the COVID-19 pandemic in Thailand, the national organizer was unable to organize the national event, and the country representative for the international tournament was appointed instead.

Winner gallery

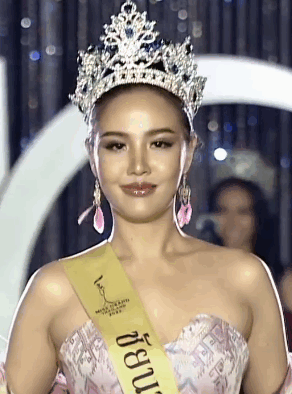
Kattaleeya Matiyapak,
Miss Grand Chai Nat 2022

== Editions ==
The following table details Miss Grand Chai Nat's annual editions since 2017.

| Edition | Date | Final venue | Entrants | Winner | Ref. |
|---|---|---|---|---|---|
| 1st (Note: Organized as an inter-provincial pageant with the Miss Grand Ang Thong and Miss Grand Sing Buri contests.) | May 2, 2017 | Paiboon Kaiyang Restaurant, Mueang Sing Buri, Sing Buri | 20 | Natnicha Khamsamran | |
| 2nd (Note: Organized as an inter-provincial pageant with the Miss Grand Kanchanaburi and Miss Grand Suphan Buri contests.) | May 26, 2018 | Robinson Lifestyle Kanchanaburi, Mueang Kanchanaburi, Kanchanaburi | 20 | Aksorn Thongplew | |
| 3rd (Note: Organized as an inter-provincial pageant with the Miss Grand Sing Buri contest.) | April 1, 2019 | Chai Nat Bird Park, Mueang Chai Nat, Chai Nat | 33 | Suwimol Semapru | |
| 4th | February 28, 2020 | Lieng Hin Dam, Mueang Chai Nat, Chai Nat | 14 | Jenjira Chanta | |
| 5th | February 27, 2022 | O2 Hotel, Mueang Lop Buri, Lopburi | 13 | Cattleya Matiyaphak | |
| 6th (Note: Organized as an inter-provincial pageant with the Miss Grand Prachinburi contest.) | November 18, 2022 | Tawa Ravadee Resort, Si Maha Phot, Prachin Buri | 10 | Chonthicha Sangkhasa | |
| 7th | January 9, 2024 | Lebua at State Tower, Bang Rak, Bangkok | 7 | Phonpak Warasophonpakdi | |
| 8th | September 21, 2024 | The Twin Towers Hotel, Pathum Wan, Bangkok | 13 | Thawinan Yangyuen | |

== National competition ==
The following is a list of Chai Nat representatives who competed at the Miss Grand Thailand pageant.

| Year | Representative | | Original provincial title | Placement at Miss Grand Thailand | Provincial director | Ref. |
| Year | Romanized name | Thai name | Original provincial title | Placement at Miss Grand Thailand | Provincial director | Ref. |
|---|---|---|---|---|---|---|
| 2016 | Walulee Duangwana | วาลุลี ดวงวะนา | Appointed | Unplaced | Unknown | |
| 2017 | Natnicha Khamsamran | ณัฐณิชา คำสำราญ | 1st runner-up Miss Grand Chai Nat 2017 | Unplaced | Chalermchai Innoi | |
| 2018 | Aksorn Thongplew | อักษร ทองเปลว | Miss Grand Chai Nat 2018 | Unplaced | Patima Kritchamaiphak | |
| 2019 | Suwimon Semapru | สุวิมล เสมาปรุ | Miss Grand Chai Nat 2019 | Top 20 | Kanatsanan Parinjit | |
| 2020 | Jenjira Chanta | เจนจิรา จันทา | Miss Grand Chai Nat 2020 | Top 20 | Thiti Pruttithada | |
| 2021 | No national pageant due to the COVID-19 pandemic. | | | | | |
| 2022 | Cattleya Matiyaphak | แคทลียา มะติยาภักดิ์ | Miss Grand Chai Nat 2022 | Unplaced | Thiti Pruttithada | |
| 2023 | Chonthicha Sangkhasa | ชลธิชา สังฆะสา | Miss Grand Chai Nat 2023 | Unplaced | Piriya Seannok | |
| 2024 | Phonphak Warasophonpakdee | ภรภัค วราโสภณภักดี | Miss Grand Chai Nat 2024 | 5th runner-up | Yutthaphum Kaewkhem | |
| 2025 | Thawinan Yangyuen | ธวินันท์ ยั่งยืน | Miss Grand Chai Nat 2025 | Unplaced | Chatnapat Chittraratsenee | |
