= Miss Grand Sing Buri =

Provincial pageant in Sing Buri, Thailand

Miss Grand ฺSing Buri มิสแกรนด์สิงห์บุรี
- Formation: May 2, 2017; 8 years ago
- Founder: Chalermchai Innoi
- Type: Beauty pageant
- Headquarters: Sing Buri
- Location: Thailand
- Official language: Thai
- Provincial Director: Tassanai Kotthong; Wichai Phromma (2025–present)
- Affiliations: Miss Grand Thailand

Summary result of Sing Buri representatives at Miss Grand Thailand
| Placement | Number(s) |
|---|---|
| Winner | 0 |
| 1st runner-up | 0 |
| 2nd runner-up | 1 |
| 3rd runner-up | 0 |
| 4th runner-up | 0 |
| Top 10/11/12 | 0 |
| Top 20/21 | 0 |
| Unplaced | 7 |

Miss Grand Sing Buri (Thai: มิสแกรนด์สิงห์บุรี) is a Thai provincial beauty pageant which selects a representative from Sing Buri province to the Miss Grand Thailand national competition. It was founded in 2017 by an entrepreneur Chalermchai Innoi (เฉลิมชัย อินน้อย).

Sing Buri representatives have yet to win the Miss Grand Thailand title. The highest and only placement they obtained in the contest was the second runner-up, won in 2016 by Athitaya Khunnalaphat.

== History ==
In 2016, after Miss Grand Thailand began franchising the provincial competitions to individual organizers, who would name seventy-seven provincial titleholders to compete in the national pageant, the license for Sing Buri province was granted to a television host Phumiphat Thammaphan (ภูมิพัฒน์ ธรรมพันธ์ or เต๋าทีวีพูล), who assigned a model Athitaya Khunnalaphat to represent the province in the 2016 national contest where she was named the second runner-up.

In 2017, the license was transferred to television personality, Chalermchai Innoi, also known as Lexy Khayee Dara (เล็กซ์ซี่ ขยี้ดารา). Innoi organized the first Miss Grand Sing Buri in parallel with the Miss Grand Ang Thong and Miss Grand Chai Nat contests on May 2, 2017, in Mueang Sing Buri, and named Nattha-an Chuesang Miss Grand Sing Buri.

In addition to the 2017 edition, the contest was occasionally then co-organized with other provincial pageants: with Miss Grand Chai Nat in 2019 and 2022, and Miss Grand Nakhon Sawan–Phayao in 2025.

The pageant was skipped once; in 2021, due to the COVID-19 pandemic in Thailand, the national organizer was unable to organize the national event, and the country representative for the international tournament was appointed instead.

Winner gallery

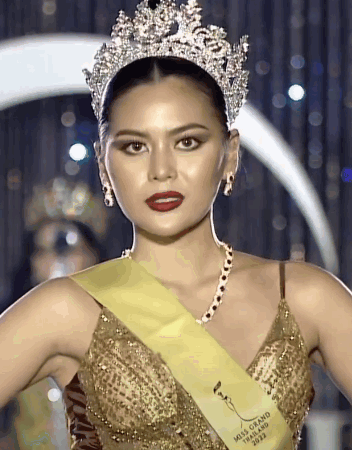
Supatsorn Somsuk,
Miss Grand Sing Buri 2022

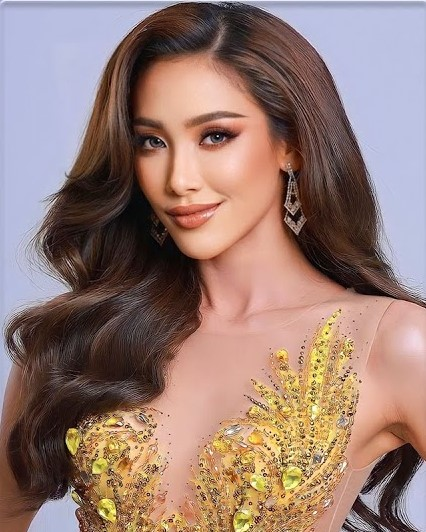
Panyada Klaipothong,
Miss Grand Sing Buri 2023

== Editions ==
The following table details Miss Grand Sing Buri's annual editions since 2017.

| Edition | Date | Final venue | Entrants | Winner | Ref. |
|---|---|---|---|---|---|
| 1st (Note: Organized as an inter-provincial pageant with the Miss Grand Ang Thong and Miss Grand Chai Nat contests.) | May 2, 2017 | Paiboon Kaiyang Restaurant, Mueang Sing Buri, Sing Buri | 20 | Nattha-an Chuesang (Note: Due to an accident, Chuesang was unable to join the 2017 national contest, the runner-up was elected as the replacement.) | |
| 2nd | February 2, 2018 | Old Singburi Provincial Hall, Mueang Sing Buri, Sing Buri | 10 | Kultida Thongleud | |
| 3rd (Note: Organized as an inter-provincial pageant with the Miss Grand Chai Nat contest.) | April 1, 2019 | Chai Nat Bird Park, Mueang Chai Nat, Chai Nat | 33 | Pornpawee Saechu | |
| 4th | August 9, 2020 | Rueanthai Hattasilp, Mueang Sing Buri, Sing Buri | 8 | Worangsiri Thanacharasworaphat | |
| 5th | February 27, 2022 | O2 Hotel, Mueang Lop Buri, Lopburi | 13 | Suphasorn Somsook | |
| 6th | January 26, 2023 | La Novia Studio, Pak Kret, Nonthaburi | 14 | Panyada Klaiphothong | |
| 7th | January 25, 2024 | Mida Hotel Ngamwongwan, Mueang Nonthaburi, Nonthaburi | 12 | Alinlaphat Srisirirangmakul | |
| 8th (Note: Organized as an inter-provincial pageant with the Miss Grand Nakhon Sawan and Miss Grand Phayao contests.) | September 28, 2024 | Central Nakhon Sawan, Mueang Nakhon Sawan, Nakhon Sawan | 30 | Panthita Saengchan (Note: Dethroned.) | |

== National competition ==
The following is a list of Ang Thong representatives who competed at the Miss Grand Thailand pageant.

| Year | Representative | | Original provincial title | Placement at Miss Grand Thailand | Provincial director | Ref. |
| Year | Romanized name | Thai name | Original provincial title | Placement at Miss Grand Thailand | Provincial director | Ref. |
|---|---|---|---|---|---|---|
| 2016 | Athitaya Khunnalaphat | อาทิตยา คุณนะลาภัทร | Appointed | 2nd runner-up | Phumiphat Thammaphan | |
| 2017 | Natthaun Chusaeng | ณัฏฐ์อัญ ชูแสง | Miss Grand Sing Buri 2018 | Resigned | Chalermchai Innoi | |
| 2017 | Nandisa Phew-on | นันทิศา ผิวอ่อน | 1st runner-up Miss Grand Sing Buri 2017 | Unplaced | Chalermchai Innoi | |
| 2018 | Kultida Thongleud | กุลธิดา ทองเลิศ | Miss Grand Sing Buri 2018 | Unplaced | Thuanthong Nokchan | |
| 2019 | Pornpawee Saechu | พรปวีณ์ แซ่ชู | Miss Grand Sing Buri 2019 | Unplaced | Kanatsanan Parinjit | |
| 2020 | Worangsiri Thanacharasworaphat | วรางค์ศิริ ธนจรัสวรภัทร์ | Miss Grand Sing Buri 2020 | Unplaced | Thiti Pruttithada | |
| 2021 | No national pageant due to the COVID-19 pandemic. | | | | | |
| 2022 | Suphasorn Somsook | สุภัสสร สมสุข | Miss Grand Sing Buri 2022 | Unplaced | Thiti Pruttithada | |
| 2023 | Panyada Klaiphothong | ปัญญดา คล้ายโพธิ์ทอง | Miss Grand Sing Buri 2023 | Unplaced | Nitipat Suphap | |
| 2024 | Alinlaphat Srisirirangmakul | อลินด์ลภัฐ ศรีศิริรังมากุล | Miss Grand Sing Buri 2024 | Unplaced | Nitipat Suphap | |
| 2025 | Pandita Saengchan | ปัณฑิตา แสงจันทร์ | Miss Grand Sing Buri 2025 | Resigned | Tassanai Kotthong | |
| 2025 | Pinyapat Khairawi | ภิญญาภัชญ์ ไขระวี | 1st runner-up Miss Grand Sing Buri 2025 | | Tassanai Kotthong | |
