= Miss Grand Rayong =

Provincial pageant in Rayong, Thailand

Miss Grand ฺRayong มิสแกรนด์ระยอง
- Formation: April 23, 2016; 10 years ago
- Founder: Somsak Thongpan
- Type: Beauty pageant
- Headquarters: Rayong
- Location: Thailand
- Official language: Thai
- Provincial Director: Phitchayin Wetchasart (2021–present)
- Affiliations: Miss Grand Thailand

Summary result of Rayong representatives at Miss Grand Thailand
| Placement | Number(s) |
|---|---|
| Winner | 0 |
| 1st runner-up | 0 |
| 2nd runner-up | 0 |
| 3rd runner-up | 0 |
| 4th runner-up | 0 |
| Top 10/11/12 | 1 |
| Top 20/21 | 1 |
| Unplaced | 6 |

Miss Grand Rayong (Thai: มิสแกรนด์ระยอง) is a Thai provincial beauty pageant which selects a representative from Rayong province to the Miss Grand Thailand national competition. It was founded in 2016 by a Thai dramatic arts teacher, Somsak Thongpan (สมศักดิ์ ทองปาน).

Rayong representatives have yet to win the Miss Grand Thailand title. The highest placement they obtained in the contest was in the top 10 finalists, achieved in 2019 by Kanyalak Nookaew.

== History ==
In 2016, after Miss Grand Thailand began franchising the provincial competitions to individual organizers, who would name seventy-seven provincial titleholders to compete in the national pageant. The license for Rayong province was granted to a teacher, Somsak Thongpan, who organized the first Miss Grand Rayong contest on April 23, 2016, in Mueang Rayong district and named a model Bheemsinee Sawangkla the winner. Thongpan relinquished the license the following year.

Occasionally, the pageant was co-organized with other provincial pageants; with Miss Grand Trat – Chanthaburi in 2017 and 2020, and with Miss Grand Ang Thong in 2022 and 2023.

The pageant was skipped once; in 2021, due to the COVID-19 pandemic in Thailand, the national organizer was unable to organize the national event, and the country representative for the international tournament was appointed instead.

Winner gallery

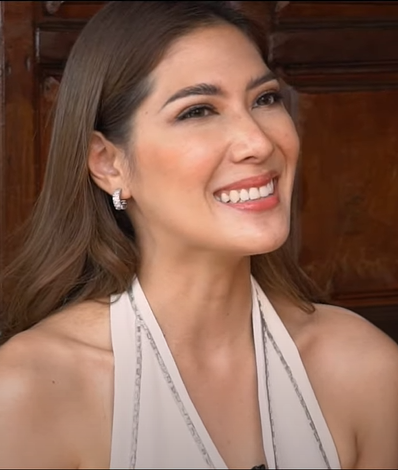
Chayanapas Chompoorat,
Miss Grand Rayong 2022

== Editions ==
The following table details Miss Grand Rayong's annual editions since 2016.

| Edition | Date | Final venue | Entrants | Winner | Ref. |
|---|---|---|---|---|---|
| 1st | April 23, 2016 | Hadsaengchan Seafood & Resort, Mueang Rayong, Rayong | 5 | Bheemsinee Sawangkla | |
| 2nd (Note: Organized an as inter-provincial pageant with the Miss Grand Trat and Miss Grand Chanthaburi.) | April 1, 2017 | New Travel Lodge Hotel, Mueang Chanthaburi, Chanthaburi | 16 | Manikar Tipphanet | |
| 3rd | May 19, 2018 | Holiday Inn & Suites Rayong City Centre, Mueang Rayong, Rayong | 15 | Jitsupak Warirattanarot | |
| 4th | March 9, 2019 | Holiday Inn & Suites Rayong City Centre, Mueang Rayong, Rayong | 15 | Kanyalak Nookaew | |
| 5th | August 15, 2020 | Ploenta Garden & Restaurant, Mueang Rayong, Rayong | 11 | Chananchida Methaphakdeesakun | |
| 6th (Note: Organized as an inter-provincial pageant with the Miss Grand Ang Thong contest.) | February 26, 2022 | Star Convention Hotel, Mueang Rayong, Rayong | 15 | Chanyanapat Chomphurat | |
| 7th | February 28, 2023 | Ploenta Garden & Restaurant, Mueang Rayong, Rayong | 15 | Anuthida Sarathana | |
| 8th | December 4, 2023 | Novotel Rayong Star Convention Centre, Mueang Rayong, Rayong | 20 | Kantapat Charoenrojthanadech | |
| 9th | January 8, 2025 | Passione Shopping Destination, Mueang Rayong, Rayong | 20 | Nongnaphat Chenghuat | |

== National competition ==
The following is a list of Rayong representatives who competed at the Miss Grand Thailand pageant.

| Year | Representative | | Original provincial title | Placement at Miss Grand Thailand | Provincial director | Ref. |
| Year | Romanized name | Thai name | Original provincial title | Placement at Miss Grand Thailand | Provincial director | Ref. |
|---|---|---|---|---|---|---|
| 2016 | Bheemsinee Sawangkhla | ภีมสินี สว่างกล้า | Miss Grand Rayong 2016 | Top 20 | Somsak Thongpan | |
| 2017 | Manika Thippanet | มณิการ์ ทิพเนตร | Miss Grand Rayong 2017 | Unplaced | Thanapat Sae-Ueng | |
| 2018 | Jitsupak Warirattanarot | จิตติ์สุภัค วารีรัตนโรจน์ | Miss Grand Rayong 2018 | Unplaced | Weerayut Anuchit-anan | |
| 2019 | Kanyalak Nookaew | กัญญาลักษณ์ หนูแก้ว | Miss Grand Rayong 2019 | Top 10 | Weerayut Anuchit-anan | |
| 2020 | Chananchida Methaphakdeesakun | ชนัญชิดา เมธาภักดีสกุล | Miss Grand Rayong 2020 | Unplaced | Punnatth Dechabun | |
| 2021 | No national pageant due to the COVID-19 pandemic. | | | | | |
| 2022 | Chanyanapat Chomphurat | ชญานภัส ชมภูรัตน์ | Miss Grand Rayong 2022 | Unplaced | Phitchayin Wetchasart | |
| 2023 | Anuthida Sarathana | อนุธิดา สารธนะ | Miss Grand Rayong 2023 | Unplaced | Phitchayin Wetchasart | |
| 2024 | Kantapat Charoenrojthanadech | กันตพัฒน์ จรัสโรจน์ธนเดช | Miss Grand Rayong 2024 | Unplaced | Phitchayin Wetchasart | |
| 2025 | Nongnaphat Chenghuat | นงนภัส เซ่งฮวด | Miss Grand Rayong 2025 | Unplaced | Phitchayin Wetchasart | |
