= Miss Grand Ang Thong =

Provincial pageant in Ang Thong, Thailand

Miss Grand Ang Thong มิสแกรนด์อ่างทอง
- Formation: April 29, 2016; 10 years ago
- Founder: Thuanthong Nokchan
- Type: Beauty pageant
- Headquarters: Ang Thong
- Location: Thailand
- Official language: Thai
- Provincial Director: Chanattee Penpoungsint (2025)
- Affiliations: Miss Grand Thailand

Summary result of Ang Thong representatives at Miss Grand Thailand
Placement	Number(s)
Winner	0
1st runner-up	0
2nd runner-up	0
3rd runner-up	1
4th runner-up	0
Top 10/11/12	0
Top 20/21	0
Unplaced	7

Miss Grand Ang Thong (Thai: มิสแกรนด์อ่างทอง) is a Thai provincial beauty pageant which selects a representative from Ang Thong province to the Miss Grand Thailand national competition. It was founded in 2016 by an event organizer Thuanthong Nokchan (ทวนทอง นกจั่น).

Ang Thong representatives have yet to win the Miss Grand Thailand title. The highest placement and only spot they obtained was the third runner-up, won in 2022 by Ornpreeya Nesa Mahmoodi.

== History ==
In 2016, after Miss Grand Thailand began franchising the provincial competitions to individual organizers, who would name seventy-seven provincial titleholders to compete in the national pageant, the license for Ang Thong province was granted to a local organizer Thuanthong Nokchan, who was also the licensee for that year's Miss Grand Lopburi. Nokchan organized the first Miss Grand Ang Thong in parallel with the Miss Grand Lopburi contest on April 29, 2016, in Sing Buri province, and named Patcharamai Boonlertkul the first Miss Grand Ang Thong.

The contest was usually co-organized with other provincial pageants, such as Miss Grand Lopburi (2016, 2018–2020), Miss Grand Sing Buri – Chai Nat (2017), and Miss Grand Rayong (2022–2023). It was a stand-alone pageant only once in 2024.

The pageant was skipped once; in 2021, due to the COVID-19 pandemic in Thailand, the national organizer was unable to organize the national event, and the country representative for the international tournament was appointed instead.

Winner gallery

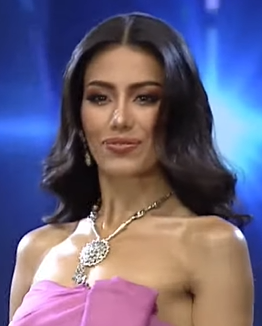
Ornpreeya Nesa Mahmoodi,
Miss Grand Ang Thong 2022

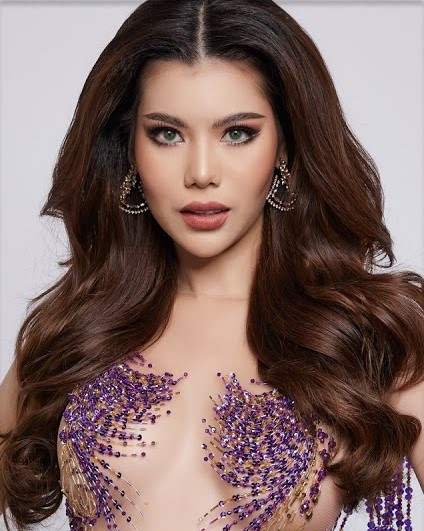
Natthakan Siamaekoo,
Miss Grand Ang Thong 2023

== Editions ==
The following table details Miss Grand Ang Thong's annual editions since 2016.

Edition	Date	Final venue	Entrants	Winner	Ref.
1st (Note: Organized as an inter-provincial pageant with the Miss Grand Lopburi contest.)	April 29, 2016	Paiboon Kaiyang Restaurant, Mueang Sing Buri, Sing Buri	10	Chanatchada Kaewprasit	
2nd (Note: Organized as an inter-provincial pageant with the Miss Grand Sing Buri and Miss Grand Chai Nat contests.)	May 2, 2017	Paiboon Kaiyang Restaurant, Mueang Sing Buri, Sing Buri	20	Ketmoli Sukkaew	
3rd	March 24, 2018	Robinson Lifestyle Lopburi, Mueang Lop Buri, Lopburi	20	Phonsirikun Puata	
4th	February 14, 2019	King Narai's Palace, Mueang Lop Buri, Lopburi	14	Thanyaphaksinee Srisuwan	
5th	July 19, 2020	Robinson Lifestyle Lopburi, Mueang Lop Buri, Lopburi	19	Phromphon Thong-uan	
6th (Note: Organized as an inter-provincial pageant with the Miss Grand Rayong contest.)	February 26, 2022	Star Convention Hotel, Mueang Rayong, Rayong	15	Ornpriya Nesa Mamoudi	
7th	February 28, 2023	Ploenta Garden & Restaurant, Mueang Rayong, Rayong	15	Nattakan Sieam-aku	
8th	November 10, 2023	The Twin Towers Hotel, Pathum Wan, Bangkok	7	Chutikarn Treetarntipakorn	
9th (Note: Organized as an inter-provincial pageant with the Miss Grand Nakhon Nayok contest.)	December 24, 2024	Siam Fantasy, Asiatique, Bangkok	10	Chanonda Pitichokwattana	
10th (Note: As an inter-provincial pageant for Miss Grand Ratchaburi, Miss Grand Nan, Miss Grand Ang Thong, Miss Grand Kamphaeng Phet, Miss Grand Kalasin, and Miss Grand Nong Khai.)	October 26, 2025	Rattana Bundit University, Bangkok	16	Phinyaphat Khairawi	

== National competition ==
The following is a list of Ang Thong representatives who competed at the Miss Grand Thailand pageant.

Year	Representative		Original provincial title	Placement at Miss Grand Thailand	Provincial director	Ref.
Year	Romanized name	Thai name	Original provincial title	Placement at Miss Grand Thailand	Provincial director	Ref.
2016	Chanatchada Kaewprasit	ชนัชดา แก้วประเสริฐ	Miss Grand Ang Thong 2016	Unplaced	Thuanthong Nokchan	
2017	Ketmoli Sukkaew	เกศโมฬี สุขแก้ว	Miss Grand Ang Thong 2017	Unplaced	Chalermchai Innoi	
2018	Phonsirikun Puata	พรศิริกุล พั่วทา	Miss Grand Ang Thong 2018	Unplaced	Thuanthong Nokchan	
2019	Thanyaphaksinee Srisuwan	ธัญภัคสิณี ศรีสุวรรณ	Miss Grand Ang Thong 2019	Unplaced	Thuanthong Nokchan	
2020	Phromphon Thong-uan	พรหมพร ทองอ้วน	Miss Grand Ang Thong 2020	Unplaced	Thuanthong Nokchan	
2021	No national pageant due to the COVID-19 pandemic.					
2022	Ornpreeya Nesa Mahmoodi	อรปรียา เนซ่า มามูดี้	Miss Grand Ang Thong 2022	3rd runner-up	Phitchayin Wetchasart	
2023	Nattakan Sieam-aku	ณัฐกานต์ เซียมเอดคู	Miss Grand Ang Thong 2023	Unplaced	Phitchayin Wetchasart	
2024	Chutikarn Treetarntipakorn	ชุติกาญจน์ ตรีธารทิพากร	Miss Grand Ang Thong 2024	Unplaced	Sittichai Rewwiroj	
2025	Chananda Pitichokwattana	ชานันดา ปิติโชควัฒนะ	Miss Grand Ang Thong 2025	Unplaced	Chanattee Penpoungsint	
2026	Phinyaphat Khairawi	ภิญญาภัชญ์ ไขระวิ	Miss Grand Ang Thong 2026		Tain Kanyapak	
