= Miss Grand Samut Sakhon =

Provincial pageant in Samut Sakhon, Thailand

Miss Grand ฺSamut Sakhon มิสแกรนด์สมุทรสาคร
- Formation: May 21, 2017; 8 years ago
- Founder: Pornthip Wongcherdkwan
- Type: Beauty pageant
- Headquarters: Samut Sakhon
- Location: Thailand
- Official language: Thai
- Provincial Directors: Smith Yaemsamran (2021–present)
- Affiliations: Miss Grand Thailand

Summary result of Samut Sakhon representatives at Miss Grand Thailand
Placement	Number(s)
Winner	0
1st runner-up	0
2nd runner-up	0
3rd runner-up	0
4th runner-up	0
Top 10/11/12	0
Top 20	1
Unplaced	7

Miss Grand Samut Sakhon (Thai: มิสแกรนด์สมุทรสาคร) is a Thai provincial beauty pageant which selects a representative from Samut Sakhon province to the Miss Grand Thailand national competition. It was founded in 2017 by Pornthip Wongcherdkwan (พรทิพย์ วงษ์เชิดขวัญ).

Samut Sakhon representatives have yet to win the Miss Grand Thailand title. The highest and only placement obtained by its representatives was in the top 20 finalists, reached in 2017 by Patamavadee Chuayprasit.

== History ==
In 2016, after Miss Grand Thailand began franchising the provincial competitions to individual organizers, who would name seventy-seven provincial titleholders to compete in the national pageant, the license for Samut Sakhon province was granted to Praphan Rayayoi (ประพันธ์ ระยาย้อย), who appointed Kamonnee Nuttayangkun as the first Miss Grand Samut Sakhon.

Later in 2017, the license was transferred to an entrepreneur, Pornthip Wongcherdkwan. She organized the first Miss Grand Samut Sakhon contest on May 21, 2017, and named Kewalee Thowdsin the winner. However, the competition result was reprobated by the national organ due to a lack of transparency. The license was then retaken and redistributed to another organizer, who organized the pageant again in Bangkok to select the replacement.

The pageant was skipped once; in 2021, due to the COVID-19 pandemic in Thailand, the national organizer was unable to organize the national event, and the country representative for the international tournament was appointed instead.

Winner gallery

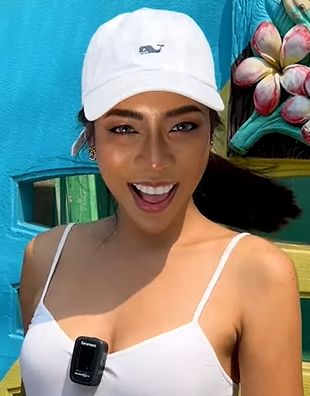
Pornchanok Srikaeo,
Miss Grand Samut Sakhon 2022

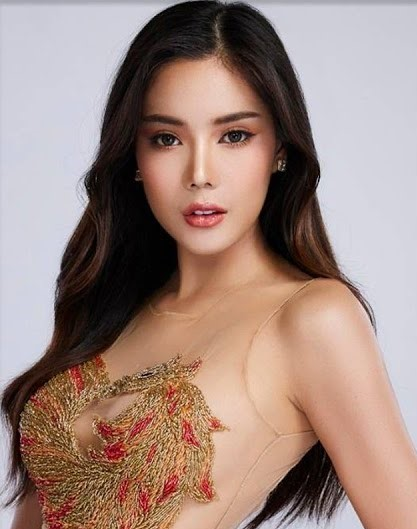
Anunya Pamonbout,
Miss Grand Samut Sakhon 2023

== Editions ==
The following table details Miss Grand Samut Sakhon's annual editions since 2017.

Edition	Date	Final venue	Entrants	Winner	Ref.
1st (Note: Due to the non-transparency, the national organ canceled the competition result and re-distributed the franchise to another organizer.)	May 21, 2017	Porto Chino Shopping Center, Mueang Samut Sakhon	17	Kewalee Thowdsin	
2nd (Note: As the replacement edition.)	May 30, 2017	Seacon Bangkae, Phasi Charoen, Bangkok	10	Patamavadee Chuayprasit	
3rd	May 31, 2018	CentralPlaza Mahachai, Mueang Samut Sakhon	15	Nongnaphat Phongsri	
4th	May 15, 2019	CentralPlaza Mahachai, Mueang Samut Sakhon	11	Nantawan Phongphithak	
5th	March 29, 2020	Bangyang Colonial, Krathum Baen, Samut Sakhon	14	Phanida Jindanoi	
6th	May 28, 2021	Mirinn Theatre, Royal City Avenue, Bangkok	20	Pornchanok Srikaew	
7th	January 8, 2023	Mirinn Theatre, Royal City Avenue, Bangkok	15	Ananya Pha-mornbut	
8th	January 28, 2024	Srinakharinwirot University Prasanmitr Campus, Bangkok	13	Suchanikar Sawok	
9th	January 15, 2024	Apollo Club, Wang Thonglang, Bangkok			

== National competition ==
The following is a list of Samut Sakhon representatives who competed at the Miss Grand Thailand pageant.

Year	Representative		Original provincial title	Placement at Miss Grand Thailand	Provincial director	Ref.
Year	Romanized name	Thai name	Original provincial title	Placement at Miss Grand Thailand	Provincial director	Ref.
2016	Kamonnee Nuttayangkun	กมลณีย์ นุตยางกูล	Appointed	Unplaced	Praphan Rayayoi	
2017	Kewalee Thowdsin	เกวลี ทวดสิญจน์	Miss Grand Samut Sakhon 2017	Dethroned	Pornthip Wongcherdkwan	
2017	Patamavadee Chuayprasit	ปฐมาวดี ช่วยประสิทธิ์	Miss Grand Samut Sakhon 2017	Top 20	Nat Chaiman	
2018	Nongnaphat Phongsri	นงนภัส ผ่องศรี	Miss Grand Samut Sakhon 2018	Unplaced	Phonwiwat Olanphonphoem	
2019	Nantawan Phongphithak	นันทวรรณ พงษ์พิทักษ์	Miss Grand Samut Sakhon 2019	Unplaced	Phanthira Nichayasurikun	
2020	Panida Jindanoi	พนิดา จินดาน้อย	Miss Grand Samut Sakhon 2020	Unplaced	Khomsan Bunyavit	
2021	No national pageant due to the COVID-19 pandemic.					
2022	Pornchanok Srikaew	พรชนก ศรีแก้ว	Miss Grand Samut Sakhon 2021/22	Unplaced	Smith Yaemsamran	
2023	Ananya Pha-mornbut	อนัญญา ภมรบุตร	Miss Grand Samut Sakhon 2023	Unplaced	Smith Yaemsamran	
2024	Suchanikar Sawok	สุชาณิการ์ สาวก	Miss Grand Samut Sakhon 2024	Unplaced	Smith Yaemsamran	
2025					Smith Yaemsamran	
