= Miss Grand Phra Nakhon Si Ayutthaya =

Provincial pageant in Phra Nakhon Si Ayutthaya, Thailand

Miss Grand Phra Nakhon Si Ayutthaya มิสแกรนด์พระนครศรีอยุธยา
- Formation: April 24, 2016; 10 years ago
- Founder: Thippawee Suphanakorn
- Type: Beauty pageant
- Headquarters: Phra Nakhon Si Ayutthaya
- Location: Thailand
- Official language: Thai
- Provincial Director: Thuanthong Nokchan (2022–present)
- Affiliations: Miss Grand Thailand

Summary result of Phra Nakhon Si Ayutthaya representatives at Miss Grand Thailand
Placement	Number(s)
Winner	0
1st runner-up	0
2nd runner-up	0
3rd runner-up	0
4th runner-up	0
Top 10/11/12	1
Top 20/21	2
Unplaced	5

Miss Grand Phra Nakhon Si Ayutthaya (Thai: มิสแกรนด์พระนครศรีอยุธยา) is a Thai provincial beauty pageant which selects a representative from Phra Nakhon Si Ayutthaya province to the Miss Grand Thailand national competition. It was founded in 2016 by an entrepreneur Thippawee Suphanakorn (ทิพภาวีร์ ศุภนคร).

Phra Nakhon Si Ayutthaya representatives have yet to win the Miss Grand Thailand title. The highest placement they obtained was in the top 10 finalists, achieved in 2020 by Isaree Rodwiset.

== History ==
In 2016, after Miss Grand Thailand began franchising the provincial competitions to individual organizers, who would name seventy-seven provincial titleholders to compete in the national pageant, the license for Phra Nakhon Si Ayutthaya province was granted to an entrepreneur Thippawee Suphanakorn, who organized the first Miss Grand Phra Nakhon Si Ayutthaya contest on April 24, 2016, at the Ayutthaya City Park, and named Thanisa Panyaphu the winner.

The pageant was skipped once; in 2021, due to the COVID-19 pandemic in Thailand, the national organizer was unable to organize the national event, and the country representative for the international tournament was appointed instead.

Winner gallery

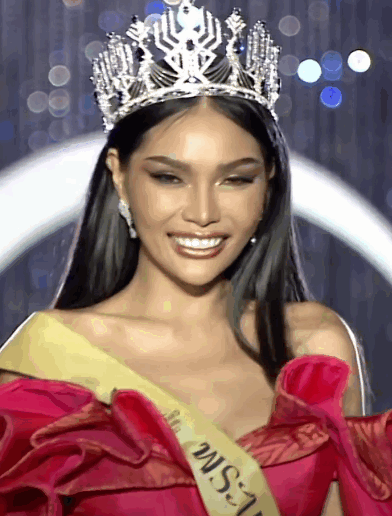
Sunaree Chaimungkun,
Miss Grand Phra Nakhon Si Ayutthaya 2022

== Editions ==
The following table details Miss Grand Phra Nakhon Si Ayutthaya's annual editions since 2016.

Edition	Date	Final venue	Entrants	Winner	Ref.
1st	April 24, 2016	Ayutthaya City Park, Phra Nakhon Si Ayutthaya	23	Thanisa Panyaphu	
2nd	January 31, 2017	Ayutthaya City Park, Phra Nakhon Si Ayutthaya	9	Thida Thongsiri	
3rd	May 2018	Ayutthaya City Park, Phra Nakhon Si Ayutthaya	11	Chanikan Lamchiak	
4th	May 11, 2019	Ayutthaya City Park, Phra Nakhon Si Ayutthaya	11	Nawaporn Rakbamrung	
5th (Note: Organized as an inter-provincial pageant with the Miss Grand Saraburi contest.)	August 15, 2020	Ayutthaya City Park, Phra Nakhon Si Ayutthaya	18	Isaree Rodwiset	
6th (Note: Organized as an inter-provincial pageant with the Miss Grand Lopburi contest.)	February 20, 2022	Central Ayutthaya, Phra Nakhon Si Ayutthaya	15	Sunaree Chaimungkhun	
7th	January 22, 2023	Ayutthaya City Park, Phra Nakhon Si Ayutthaya	14	Nanmanus Kraiha	
8th	January 14, 2024	Ayutthaya City Park, Phra Nakhon Si Ayutthaya	9	Jiranat Chiraphatphuwanon	
9th	January 5, 2025	Ayutthaya City Park, Phra Nakhon Si Ayutthaya	16	Thanchanok Keawpatcha	

== National competition ==
The following is a list of Phra Nakhon Si Ayutthaya representatives who competed at the Miss Grand Thailand pageant.

Year	Representative		Original provincial title	Placement at Miss Grand Thailand	Provincial director	Ref.
Year	Romanized name	Thai name	Original provincial title	Placement at Miss Grand Thailand	Provincial director	Ref.
2016	Thanisa Panyaphu	ธนิศา ปัญญาภู	Miss Grand Phra Nakhon Si Ayutthaya 2016	Top 20	Thippawee Suphanakorn	
2017	Thida Thongsiri	ธิดา ทองศิริ	Miss Grand Phra Nakhon Si Ayutthaya 2017	Unplaced	Phanthitra Khamwan	
2018	Chanikan Lamchiak	ชนิกานต์ ลำเจียก	Miss Grand Phra Nakhon Si Ayutthaya 2018	Unplaced	Thanakrit Kittithamkul	
2019	Nawaporn Rakbamrung	นวพร รักบำรุง	Miss Grand Phra Nakhon Si Ayutthaya 2019	Unplaced	Thanakrit Kittithamkul	
2020	Isaree Rodwiset	อิสรีย์ รอดวิเศษ	Miss Grand Phra Nakhon Si Ayutthaya 2020	Top 10	Thanakrit Kittithamkul	
2021	No national pageant due to the COVID-19 pandemic.					
2022	Sunaree Chaimungkhun	สุนารี ชัยมุงคุณ	Miss Grand Phra Nakhon Si Ayutthaya 2022	Top 20	Thuanthong Nokchan	
2023	Nanmanus Kraiha	นันท์มนัส ไกรหา	Miss Grand Phra Nakhon Si Ayutthaya 2023	Unplaced	Thuanthong Nokchan	
2024	Jiranat Chiraphatphuwanon	จิรณัฏฐ์ จิรภัทรภูวนนท์	Miss Grand Phra Nakhon Si Ayutthaya 2024	Unplaced	Thuanthong Nokchan	
2025	Thanchanok Keawpatcha	ธัญชนก แก้วปัชฌาย์	Miss Grand Phra Nakhon Si Ayutthaya 2025	Unplaced	Thuanthong Nokchan	
