= Miss Grand Pathum Thani =

Provincial pageant in Pathum Thani, Thailand

Miss Grand ฺPathum Thani มิสแกรนด์ปทุมธานี
- Formation: May 15, 2016; 9 years ago
- Founder: Nanyaphat Kotchasan
- Type: Beauty pageant
- Headquarters: Pathum Thani
- Location: Thailand
- Official language: Thai
- Provincial Director: Anusit Thungsuk (2023–present)
- Affiliations: Miss Grand Thailand

Summary result of Pathum Thani representatives at Miss Grand Thailand
Placement	Number(s)
Winner	0
1st runner-up	2
2nd runner-up	0
3rd runner-up	0
4th runner-up	0
Top 10/11/12	0
Top 20	1
Unplaced	6

Miss Grand Pathum Thani (Thai: มิสแกรนด์ปทุมธานี) is a Thai provincial beauty pageant which selects a representative from Pathum Thani province to the Miss Grand Thailand national competition. It was founded in 2016 by an entrepreneur Nanyaphat Kotchasan (นัญญภัสว์ คชสาร).

Pathum Thani representatives have yet to win the Miss Grand Thailand title. The highest placement obtained by its representatives was the first runner-up, won in 2020 and 2024 by Indy Johnson and Kanyaphatsaphon Rungrueang. However, the 2020 first runner-up, Indy Johnson, was later appointed Miss Grand Thailand 2021 due to the COVID-19-related cancellation of the 2021 national contest.

== History ==
In 2016, after Miss Grand Thailand began franchising the provincial competitions to individual organizers, who would name seventy-seven provincial titleholders to compete in the national pageant, the license for Pathum Thani province was granted to Nanyaphat Kotchasan, who organized the first Miss Grand Pathum Thani contest on May 15, 2016, in Rangsit, and Suphattra Rodphai was named the winner.

After Kotchasan relinquished the franchise in 2019, it was granted to different organizers annually until it came into the hands of a talent manager Anusit Thungsuk who served as the pageant director since 2023.

The pageant was skipped once; in 2021, due to the COVID-19 pandemic in Thailand, the national organizer was unable to organize the national event, and the country representative for the international tournament was appointed instead.

Winner gallery

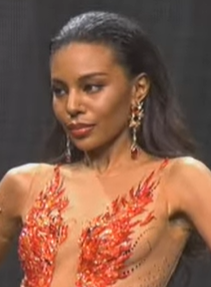
Indy Johnson,
Miss Grand Pathum Thani 2020

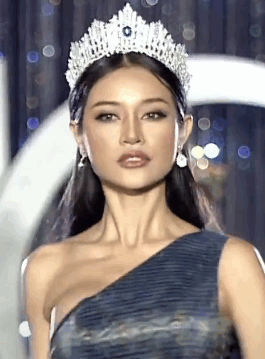
Wichida Nuamsorn,
Miss Grand Pathum Thani 2022

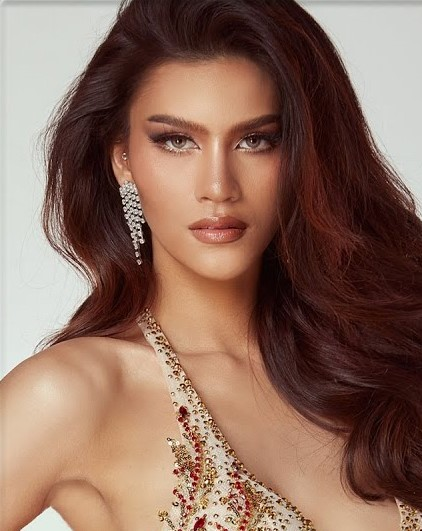
Sophie Siriyakorn Trau,
Miss Grand Pathum Thani 2023

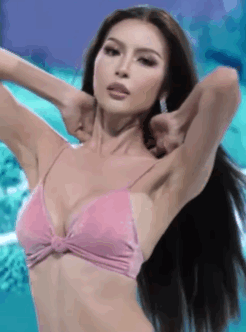
Kanyaphatsaphon Rungrueang,
Miss Grand Pathum Thani 2024

== Editions ==
The following table details Miss Grand Pathum Thani's annual editions since 2016.

Edition	Date	Final venue	Entrants	Winner	Ref.
1st	May 15, 2016	The Hub Rangsit (Zeer Rangsit), Lam Luk Ka, Pathum Thani	14	Suphattra Rodphai	
2nd	May 21, 2017	The Hub Rangsit (Zeer Rangsit), Lam Luk Ka, Pathum Thani	19	Jiranan Sawaengha	
3rd	April 28, 2018	The Hub Rangsit (Zeer Rangsit), Lam Luk Ka, Pathum Thani	20	Pitchayapha Charoenpanya	
4th	May 12, 2019	Major Cineplex, Future Park Rangsit, Thanyaburi, Pathum Thani	9	Hathaithip Rueangaram	
5th	July 19, 2020	The Hub Rangsit (Zeer Rangsit), Lam Luk Ka, Pathum Thani	12	Indy Johnson	
6th	June 13, 2021	De Nakarar, Khlong Sam, Pathum Thani	17	Wichida Nuamsorn	
7th	March 2023	Central Chaengwattana, Pak Kret, Nonthaburi	20	Sophie Siriyakorn Trau	
8th	January 30, 2024	Mirinn Theatre, Royal City Avenue, Bangkok	12	Kanyaphatsaphon Rungrueang	
9th	December 23, 2024	Vanessa Cabaret Show, Lat Krabang, Bangkok	17	Aitsari Rodwised	

== National competition ==
The following is a list of Pathum Thani representatives who competed at the Miss Grand Thailand pageant.

Year	Representative		Original provincial title	Placement at Miss Grand Thailand	Provincial director	Ref.
Year	Romanized name	Thai name	Original provincial title	Placement at Miss Grand Thailand	Provincial director	Ref.
2016	Suphattra Rodphai	สุภัทตรา รอดภัย	Miss Grand Pathum Thani 2016	Unplaced	Nanyaphat Kotchasan	
2017	Jiranan Sawaengha	จีรนันท์ แสวงหา	Miss Grand Pathum Thani 2017	Unplaced	Nanyaphat Kotchasan	
2018	Pitchayapha Charoenpanya	พิชญาภา เจริญปัญญา	Miss Grand Pathum Thani 2018	Unplaced	Nanyaphat Kotchasan	
2019	Hathaithip Rueangaram	หทัยทิพย์ เรืองอร่าม	Miss Grand Pathum Thani 2019	Unplaced	Jirawan Ruchit	
2020	Indy Johnson	อินดี จอห์นสัน	Miss Grand Pathum Thani 2020	1st runner-up	Nanyaphat Kotchasan	
2021	Indy Johnson (Note: Later appointed Miss Grand Thailand 2021.)	อินดี จอห์นสัน	Miss Grand Pathum Thani 2020	Winner (Appointed)	Nanyaphat Kotchasan	
2022	Wichida Nuamsorn	วิชิดา น่วมสอน	Miss Grand Pathum Thani 2021/22	Unplaced	Amarin Atthayoko	
2023	Sophie Siriyakorn Trau	โซฟี สิริยากรณ์ เทรา	Miss Grand Pathum Thani 2023	Top 20	Anusit Thungsuk	
2024	Kanyaphatsaphon Rungrueang	กัญภัสภร รุ่งเรือง	Miss Grand Pathum Thani 2024	1st runner-up	Anusit Thungsuk	
2025	Aitsari Rodwises	อิสรีย์ รอดวิเศษ	Miss Grand Pathum Thani 2025	Unplaced	Anusit Thungsuk	
