= Miss Grand Saraburi =

Provincial pageant in Saraburi, Thailand

Miss Grand ฺSaraburi มิสแกรนด์สระบุรี
- Formation: May 22, 2016; 10 years ago
- Founder: Bunma Imwises
- Type: Beauty pageant
- Headquarters: Saraburi
- Location: Thailand
- Official language: Thai
- Provincial Director: Sarinlada Mahakit-akkarapong (2023–present)
- Affiliations: Miss Grand Thailand

Summary result of Saraburi representatives at Miss Grand Thailand
Placement	Number(s)
Winner	0
1st runner-up	0
2nd runner-up	0
3rd runner-up	0
4th runner-up	0
Top 10/11/12	3
Top 20/21	1
Unplaced	5

Miss Grand Saraburi (Thai: มิสแกรนด์สระบุรี) is a Thai provincial beauty pageant which selects a representative from Saraburi province to the Miss Grand Thailand national competition. It was founded in 2016 by an entrepreneur Bunma Imwises (บุญมา อิ่มวิเศษ).

Saraburi representatives have yet to win the Miss Grand Thailand title. The highest placement obtained by its representatives was in the fifth runners-up or top 10 finalists, won in 2017, 2023, and 2024.

== History ==
In 2016, after Miss Grand Thailand began franchising the provincial competitions to individual organizers, who would name seventy-seven provincial titleholders to compete in the national pageant, the license for Saraburi province was granted to Bunma Imwises, an entrepreneur who was also the sponsor for Miss Grand Thailand pageant in 2016. Imwises organized the first Miss Grand Saraburi contest on May 22, 2016, in Mueang Saraburi, and named Chanokpimmada Chatmuangpak the winner. Imwises was also the licensee in 2017.

The pageant was skipped in 2021, due to the COVID-19 pandemic in Thailand, the national organizer was unable to organize the national event, and the country representative for the international tournament was appointed instead.

Winner gallery

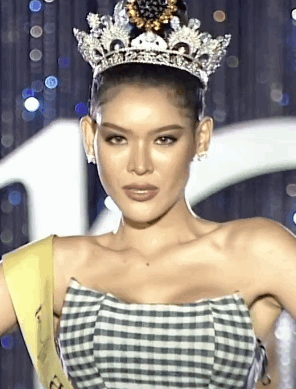
Nareerat Wannawohan,
Miss Grand Saraburi 2022

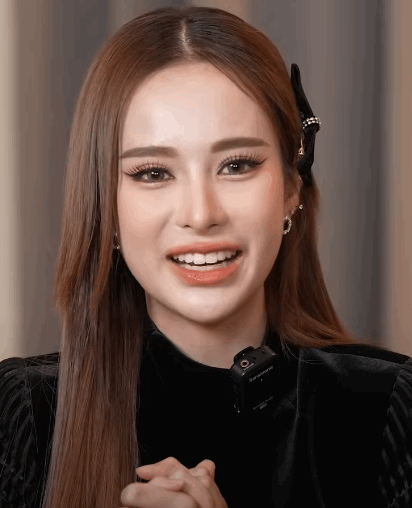
Thitaree Phongtharasathorn,
Miss Grand Saraburi 2025

== Editions ==
The following table details Miss Grand Saraburi's annual editions since 2016.

Edition	Date	Final venue	Entrants	Winner	Ref.
1st	May 22, 2016	Robinson Lifestyle Saraburi, Mueang Saraburi, Saraburi	13	Chanokpimmada Chatmuangpak	
2nd	March 19, 2017	R-Rom-D Resort, Phra Phutthabat, Saraburi	20	Lelani Totsapon	
3rd	March 3, 2018	Robinson Lifestyle Saraburi, Mueang Saraburi, Saraburi	8	Jutinat Phurahong	
4th	March 3, 2019	Robinson Lifestyle Saraburi, Mueang Saraburi, Saraburi	13	Krittaporn Thipsuk	
5th (Note: Organized as an inter-provincial pageant with the Miss Grand Phra Nakhon Si Ayutthaya contest.)	August 15, 2020	Ayutthaya City Park, Phra Nakhon Si Ayutthaya	18	Kanokporn Phayungwong	
6th	February 28, 2022	Rajamangala University of Technology Phra Nakhon, Bangkok	7	Nareerat Wannawohan	
7th	September 10, 2022	MCC Hall, The Mall Lifestore Ngamwongwan, Nonthaburi	39	Vanessa Natcha Wenk	
8th (Note: Organized as an inter-provincial pageant with the Miss Grand Bangkok contest.)	September 17, 2023	MGI Hall, Show DC Mega Complex, Huai Khwang, Bangkok	20	Suntaree Uan-inth	
9th	September 8, 2024	Central Chaengwattana, Pak Kret, Nonthaburi	25	Thitaree Phongtharasathorn	

== National competition ==
The following is a list of Saraburi representatives who competed at the Miss Grand Thailand pageant.

Year	Representative		Original provincial title	Placement at Miss Grand Thailand	Provincial director	Ref.
Year	Romanized name	Thai name	Original provincial title	Placement at Miss Grand Thailand	Provincial director	Ref.
2016	Chanokpimmada Chatmuangpak	ชนกพิมพ์มาดา ฉัตรเมืองปัก	Miss Grand Saraburi 2016	Unplaced	Bunma Imwises	
2017	Lelani Totsapon	เลลาณี ทศพร	Miss Grand Saraburi 2017	Top 10	Bunma Imwises	
2018	Jutinat Phurahong	จุติณัฏฐ์ ภู่ระหงษ์	Miss Grand Saraburi 2018	Unplaced	Krittanon Rattanachayangkun	
2019	Krittaporn Thipsuk	กฤตภรณ์ ทิพย์สุข	Miss Grand Saraburi 2019	Unplaced	Krittanon Rattanachayangkun	
2020	Kanokporn Phayungwong	กนกพร พยุงวงษ์	Miss Grand Saraburi 2020	Unplaced	Thanakrit Kittithamkul	
2021	No national pageant due to the COVID-19 pandemic.					
2022	Nareerat Wannawohan	นารีรัตน์ วรรณโวหาร	Miss Grand Saraburi 2022	Unplaced	Phayu Kanla	
2023	Vanessa Nattacha Wenk	วาเนสซ่า เว้งค์	Miss Grand Saraburi 2023	5th runner-up	Ratcharin Udmuangkam (Renamed: Sarinlada Mahakit- akkarapong in 2024)	
2024	Suntaree Uan-inth	สุนทรี อ้วนอินทร์	Miss Grand Saraburi 2024	5th runner-up	Ratcharin Udmuangkam (Renamed: Sarinlada Mahakit- akkarapong in 2024)	
2025	Thitaree Phongtharasathorn	ฐิตารีย์ พงศ์ธรสาธร	Miss Grand Saraburi 2025	Top 20	Ratcharin Udmuangkam (Renamed: Sarinlada Mahakit- akkarapong in 2024)	
2026	Natthakitta Kerdkanchiroj	ณัฐกฤตา เกิดแก่นจิโรจ	Miss Grand Saraburi 2026	3rd Runner-Up	Ratcharin Udmuangkam (Renamed: Sarinlada Mahakit- akkarapong in 2024)	
