= Miss Grand Thailand 2024 =

11th Miss Grand Thailand competition, beauty pageant edition

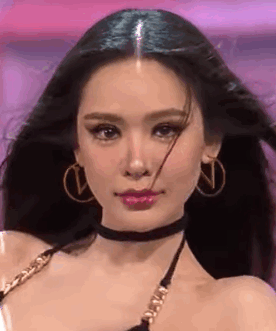
- Malin Chara-anan, Miss Grand Thailand 2024
- Date: April 6, 2024
- Presenters: Matthew Deane
- Venue: MGI Hall, Bravo BKK Mall, Bangkok
- Broadcaster: YouTube
- Entrants: 77
- Placements: 20
- Winner: Malin Chara-anan (Phuket)
- Best National Costume: Nanthicha Yangwatthana (Nakhon Ratchasima)
- Photogenic: Suntaree Uan-inth (Saraburi)
- Best in Swimsuit: Natthakan Kunchayawanat (Chonburi)

External videos
- Grand final competition

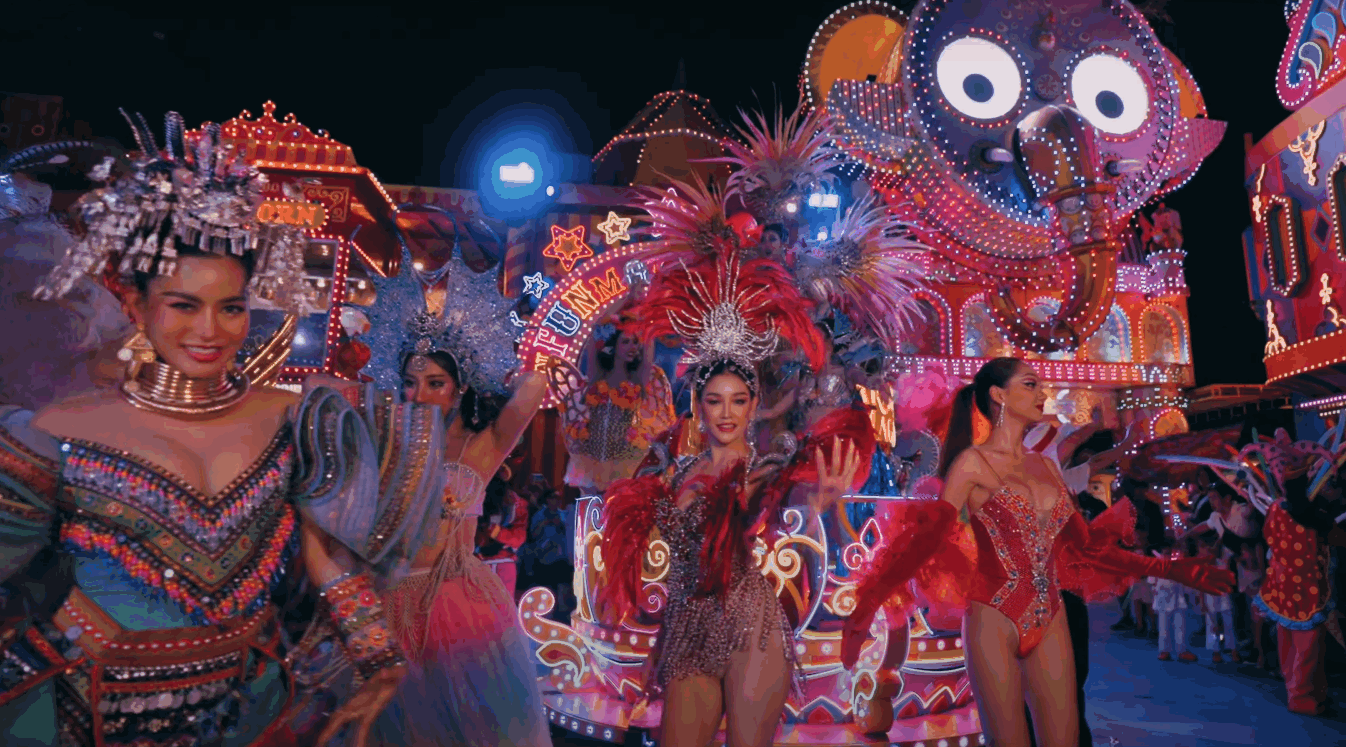
Miss Grand Thailand 2024 delegates paraded in the carnival costume in the theme of City of Lights: Magic Carnival at Carnival Magic, held on March 13, 2024, at the Carnival Magic Theme Park, Phuket.

Miss Grand Thailand 2024 (Thai: มิสแกรนด์ไทยแลนด์ 2024) was the 11th edition of the Miss Grand Thailand pageant, held on April 6, 2024, at the organizer-owned hall, MGI Hall, located in the Bravo BKK Mall, Bangkok. Representatives of seventy-seven administrative divisions of the country competed for the title, of whom a 27-year-old Thai-Singaporean beauty influencer and entrepreneur representing Phuket, Malin Chara-anan, was announced the winner. Malin was crowned by Miss Grand Thailand 2023, Thaweeporn Phingchamrat of Chumphon. Malin later represented Thailand in Miss Grand International 2024, and was placed among the top 20 finalists.

Initially, the pageant boot camp was programmed to be arranged in Songkhla Province, but was later canceled due to the opposing political views between the national organizer and the royalist and conservative local governments, and Phuket Province was chosen as the replacement, making it the second time the pageant was hosted in the province.

The event was live-transmitted to audiences worldwide via the pageant's YouTube channel, GrandTV, with a Thai-Australian Matthew Deane as the host.

== Background ==
=== Selection of the host province ===
During the press conference of the Miss Grand Songkhla 2023 pageant held on November 30, 2022, a memorandum of understanding (MOU) to host the 2024 national pageant of Miss Grand Thailand between the national organizer, MGI PLC, and Hat Yai local governments were also signed. However, the proposition was later canceled due to the opposing political views between the organizer, which supports the center-left parties in the 2023 Thai general election, and the local governments, which support the right-wing politics, as well as the conflict between the national director, Nawat Itsaragrisil, and the 2023 Miss Grand Songkhla provincial director, Chanpen Parisuttho-Namchanda, who disagree with expressing political opinions on the beauty pageant stage.

As the pageant president declared on his personal social media in late-May 2023, Phuket was expected to be a new preliminary host province after the center-left Move Forward Party, making it a clean sweep of all three provincial MP seats contested in the 2023 Thai general election held on May 14. Previously, the province was usually the bastion of right-wing, conservative, and royalist parties, such as the Democrat Party and Palang Pracharath Party. The official confirmation was later made at the Miss Grand Thailand 2024 press conference organized at the Show DC Mega Complex on July 27, 2023. Meanwhile, the grand final round was set for Bangkok, as in all previous editions.

=== Location and date ===
The pageant activities was scheduled for March 3 to April 6, with 8 sub-contests, 4 of which, including the Southern Thai costume contest, swimsuit competition, Miss Darling of Phuket, and the Grand Concert Live in Phuket, will be organized in the preliminary host province, Phuket, while the remaining 4 events, namely the national costume competition, Miss Grand T-pop star, preliminary competition, and the grand gala final, will happen in Bangkok.

The following is a list of Miss Grand Thailand 2024's main events.

Host: Phuket
Main venue: Saphan Hin Municipal Stadium

- March 17: Southern Thai costume contest
- March 18: Swimsuit contest
- March 19: Miss Darling of Phuket
- March 20: Grand Concert Live in Phuket

Host: Bangkok
Main venue: MGI Hall, Bravo BKK Mall

- March 30: National costume contest
- April 1: Miss Grand T-pop Star contest
- April 3: Preliminary round
- April 6: Grand coronation

=== Selection of contestants ===
All of the Miss Grand Thailand 2024 contestants were determined through the provincial contests, which was held by different local organizers who, in some cases, are responsible for more than one province. In some provinces, such as Prachuap Khiri Khan, district-level pageants were also held. The provincial winners hold the title "Miss Grand (Province)" for the year of their reign.

Sixty-eight provincial pageants with a total of 77 titles were organized in different provinces all over the country; 21 of which happened in the capital, Bangkok. The following is a list of the provinces that organized their provincial contests for Miss Grand Thailand 2024.

Number of		Host province	Provincial titles	Total titles
Pageant(s)/ Province	Title(s)/ Province	Host province	Provincial titles	Total titles
21	24	Bangkok	Event 1 – Amnat Charoen / Event 2 – Bangkok; Event 3 – Samut Sakhon / Event 4 – Nan; Event 5 – Phang Nga, Phatthalung, and Satun: Event 6 – Saraburi / Event 7 – Chai Nat; Event 8 – Phetchabun / Event 9 – Ratchaburi; Event 10 – Nong Bua Lamphu: Event 11 – Prachin Buri / Event 12 – Sakhon Nakhon; Event 13 – Sing Buri / Event 14 – Mukdahan; Event 15 – Chumphon and Phichit: Event 16 – Nakhon Nayok / Event 17 – Nakhon Pathom; Event 18 – Loei / Event 19 – Ang Thong; Event 20 – Pathum Thani / Event 21 – Sa Kaeo	24
2	5	Chonburi	Event 1 – Chonburi; Event 2 – Krabi, Narathiwas, Pattani, and Yala	5
2	3	Chiang Mai	Event 1 – Chiang Mai; Event 2 – Lampang and Lamphun	3
1	2	Maha Sarakham	Maha Sarakham, Kalasin	4
1	2	Tak	Tak, Uthai Thani	4
1	1	Pathum Thani	Phayao	1
1	1	Other 40 provinces		40
Total provincial titles				77

== Result ==
Color keys

For regional group:	For international placement:
N Northern group	The contestant won in an international pageant.
NE Northeastern group	The contestant was a runner-up in an international pageant.
C Central group	The contestant was a semi-finalist in an international pageant.
S Southern group	The contestant was unplaced in an international pageant.

=== Placements ===
Placement	Contestants	International placement
Miss Grand Thailand 2024	S Phuket – Malin Chara-anan^{[π]}	Top 20 – Miss Grand International 2024
1st runner-up	C Pathum Thani – Kanyaphatsaphon Rungrueang	Top 10 – Miss Asia Pacific International 2024
2nd runner-up	S Chumphon – Kittiyaporn Fungmee	Top 11 – Miss Aura International 2024
3rd runner-up	N Lampang – Thansita Dilhokanansakul	1st runner-up – The Miss Globe 2024
4th runner-up	NE Maha Sarakham – Aoratai Phangchan	
5th runners-up	C Bangkok – Yuwaporn Songngam; C Chai Nat – Phoraphak Worasophonphakdee^{[∆]}; N Phichit – Piyarada Wayuwech; NE Sakon Nakhon – Napapat Rungroj; C Saraburi – Suntaree Uan-inth^{[§]}; S Satun – Emma Martini^{[‡]}	
Top 20	NE Buriram – Viranya Berry	2nd runner up (Assumed) – Miss Grand International 2024^{[þ]}
Top 20	C Chonburi – Natthakaan Kunghayawanut	Top 11 – Miss Eco International 2025
Top 20	NE Mukdahan – Nattha Intasao	1st runner-up – Miss Tourism International 2024
Top 20	NE Nakhon Phanom – Sasicha Duangket	Top 10 – Miss Tourism International 2025
Top 20	N Lamphun – Rattanarapee Thammachaikul; N Nan – Prakaiphetch Umakorn; S Phang Nga – Supannika Nopparat; S Ranong – Natthawikarn Pheukamornkul; N Sukhothai – Lapatthida Khongkraphanth; C Suphan Buri – Kanokwan Nansoongnoen	

Notes

^∆ Automatically qualified for the Top 11 finalists after winning the fast track "Miss Popular vote".
^§ Automatically qualified for the Top 11 finalists after winning the fast track "Best Seller".
^‡ Automatically qualified for the Top 11 finalists after winning the "Boss Choice" award.
^π Automatically qualified for the Top 5 finalists after winning the "Boss Choice" award.
^þ As Miss Grand United Kingdom.

=== Main special awards ===
Award	Contestants
Miss Darling of Phuket	Pathum Thani – Kanyaphatsaphon Rungrueang
Miss Popular Vote	Chai Nat – Phoraphak Worasophonphakdee
Miss Photogenic	Saraburi – Suntaree Uan-inth
Miss Grand Best Seller	Saraburi – Suntaree Uan-inth
Miss Grand T-Pop Star	Maha Sarakham – Aoratai Phangchan; Mukdahan – Nattha Intasao; Nakhon Phanom – Sasicha Duangket; Phayao – Panvasa Kachunram; Phichit – Piyarada Wayuwech; Ranong – Natthawikarn Pheukamornkul; Sakon Nakhon – Napapat Rungroj; Satun – Emma Martini
Best in Swimsuit	Chonburi – Natthakan Kunchayawanat
Best Introduction	Mukdahan – Nattha Intasao
Best National Costume	Nakhon Ratchasima - Nanthicha Yangwatthana
Best Southern Thai Costume	Tak – Piyaporn Suksom
Awards given to the provincial teams
Best Provincial Director	Phuket – Teerasak Pholngam
Best Designer	Trang – Narin Sutawong of Narin Boutique

=== Ancillary awards ===
Before the beginning of the pageant camp, several live-stream selling challenges were performed. Each provincial representative had to sell the organizer's products through live streams on digital platforms to meet the sales target set by the organizer. All participating candidates received 15% of their sales. If the target was archived, the candidates qualified for the organizer-related entertainment activities, such as becoming a special guest in the concert or an actress, etc.

The following table details the winners of all ancillary awards given in the Miss Grand Thailand 2024 pageant, which included the awards and cash prizes delivered by the sponsors. In addition to the main winners, some runners-up in these titles also received prizes.

Best Arrival		Best in Grand Carnival		Special awards in Miss Darling of Phuket contest
Presenter	CHAT Cosmetics	Presenter	MGI PCL	Award	Winner	Prize
Prize	฿50,000 Baht each	Prize	฿10,000 Baht each	People Choice	Bangkok	฿50,000 Baht
Winners	Amnat Charoen; Bangkok; Chai Nat; Lamphun; Pathum Thani; Phuket	Winners	Nonthaburi; Mae Hong Son; Phang Nga; Phuket; Trang
Winners	Amnat Charoen; Bangkok; Chai Nat; Lamphun; Pathum Thani; Phuket	Winners	Nonthaburi; Mae Hong Son; Phang Nga; Phuket; Trang	Best Social Media	Phuket	฿20,000 Baht
Winners	Amnat Charoen; Bangkok; Chai Nat; Lamphun; Pathum Thani; Phuket	Winners	Nonthaburi; Mae Hong Son; Phang Nga; Phuket; Trang	Best Hair & Skin	Phatthalung	฿10,000 Baht
Winners	Amnat Charoen; Bangkok; Chai Nat; Lamphun; Pathum Thani; Phuket	Winners	Nonthaburi; Mae Hong Son; Phang Nga; Phuket; Trang	Miss WOW Factor	Phuket	฿10,000 Baht
Winners	Amnat Charoen; Bangkok; Chai Nat; Lamphun; Pathum Thani; Phuket	Winners	Nonthaburi; Mae Hong Son; Phang Nga; Phuket; Trang	Miss Bellevue Beachfront	Roi Et	฿10,000 Baht
Winners	Amnat Charoen; Bangkok; Chai Nat; Lamphun; Pathum Thani; Phuket	Blank		IDL Grand IDOL	Maha Sarakham; Phuket	฿10,000 Baht
Blank				IDL Grand IDOL	Maha Sarakham; Phuket	฿10,000 Baht

La Glace Beabie Vibes		Best in Peranakans Fashion		Tik Tok live-stream selling challenges
Presenter	La Glace Thailand	Presenter	MGI PCL	Challenge	Winner(s)
Prize	฿50,000 Baht	Prize	฿10,000 Baht	MGI PCL's Thank You Party	Mukdahan; Ranong	Became guest singers in the MGI PCL's Thank You Party
Winner	Chumphon	Winner	Kanchanaburi	MGI PCL's Thank You Party	Mukdahan; Ranong	Became guest singers in the MGI PCL's Thank You Party
Blank				The Grand Concert: Miracle Snack	Saraburi	Became guest singer in The; Grand Concert: Miracle Snack
Best Seller		Best Promoter		The Grand Concert: Miracle Snack	Saraburi	Became guest singer in The; Grand Concert: Miracle Snack
Presenter	Cathy Doll Cosmetics	Presenter	Wink White Co., Ltd.	MGI's Pageant Training Course	Phichit; Chumphon; Phuket; Saraburi; Bangkok	Ranong; Mukdahan; Chiang Mai; Phatthalung; Nan
Prize	฿10,000 Baht	Prize	฿50,000 Baht	MGI's Pageant Training Course	Phichit; Chumphon; Phuket; Saraburi; Bangkok	Ranong; Mukdahan; Chiang Mai; Phatthalung; Nan
Winner	Kalasin	Winner	Ang Thong	MGI's Pageant Training Course	Phichit; Chumphon; Phuket; Saraburi; Bangkok	Ranong; Mukdahan; Chiang Mai; Phatthalung; Nan
Blank				MGI's Pageant Training Course	Phichit; Chumphon; Phuket; Saraburi; Bangkok	Ranong; Mukdahan; Chiang Mai; Phatthalung; Nan
Miss Shakira		Miss Bearbeary		MGI's Pageant Training Course	The winners attended the pageant training course organized by the MGI PCL
Presenter	Shakira	Presenter	Bearbeary	MGI's Pageant Training Course	The winners attended the pageant training course organized by the MGI PCL
Prize	Shakira products	Prize	฿10,000 Baht	MGI's Drama Projects (The winners became actresses in the dramas produced by the MGI PCL)	Bangkok; Chaiyaphum; Chumphon; Kalasin; Kanchanaburi; Lampang; Lumphun; Maha Sarakham; Mukdahan; Nan; Nakhon Phanom; Nakhon Sawan; Phang Nga	Phatthalung; Phetchaburi; Phichit; Phitsanulok; Phuket; Ranong; Sakon Nakhon; Saraburi; Satun; Sisaket; Surin; Trang
Winner	Nakhon Phanom	Winner	Phuket	MGI's Drama Projects (The winners became actresses in the dramas produced by the MGI PCL)	Bangkok; Chaiyaphum; Chumphon; Kalasin; Kanchanaburi; Lampang; Lumphun; Maha Sarakham; Mukdahan; Nan; Nakhon Phanom; Nakhon Sawan; Phang Nga	Phatthalung; Phetchaburi; Phichit; Phitsanulok; Phuket; Ranong; Sakon Nakhon; Saraburi; Satun; Sisaket; Surin; Trang
Blank				MGI's Drama Projects (The winners became actresses in the dramas produced by the MGI PCL)	Bangkok; Chaiyaphum; Chumphon; Kalasin; Kanchanaburi; Lampang; Lumphun; Maha Sarakham; Mukdahan; Nan; Nakhon Phanom; Nakhon Sawan; Phang Nga	Phatthalung; Phetchaburi; Phichit; Phitsanulok; Phuket; Ranong; Sakon Nakhon; Saraburi; Satun; Sisaket; Surin; Trang
Shakira Queen		Miss Medice Supper Seller		MGI's Drama Projects (The winners became actresses in the dramas produced by the MGI PCL)	Bangkok; Chaiyaphum; Chumphon; Kalasin; Kanchanaburi; Lampang; Lumphun; Maha Sarakham; Mukdahan; Nan; Nakhon Phanom; Nakhon Sawan; Phang Nga	Phatthalung; Phetchaburi; Phichit; Phitsanulok; Phuket; Ranong; Sakon Nakhon; Saraburi; Satun; Sisaket; Surin; Trang
Presenter	Shakira	Presenter	Medice Medical Inc.	MGI's Drama Projects (The winners became actresses in the dramas produced by the MGI PCL)	Bangkok; Chaiyaphum; Chumphon; Kalasin; Kanchanaburi; Lampang; Lumphun; Maha Sarakham; Mukdahan; Nan; Nakhon Phanom; Nakhon Sawan; Phang Nga	Phatthalung; Phetchaburi; Phichit; Phitsanulok; Phuket; Ranong; Sakon Nakhon; Saraburi; Satun; Sisaket; Surin; Trang
Prize	฿50,000 Baht	Prize	฿100,000 Baht	MGI's Drama Projects (The winners became actresses in the dramas produced by the MGI PCL)	Bangkok; Chaiyaphum; Chumphon; Kalasin; Kanchanaburi; Lampang; Lumphun; Maha Sarakham; Mukdahan; Nan; Nakhon Phanom; Nakhon Sawan; Phang Nga	Phatthalung; Phetchaburi; Phichit; Phitsanulok; Phuket; Ranong; Sakon Nakhon; Saraburi; Satun; Sisaket; Surin; Trang
Winner	Nakhon Pathom	Winner	Pathum Thani	MGI's Drama Projects (The winners became actresses in the dramas produced by the MGI PCL)	Bangkok; Chaiyaphum; Chumphon; Kalasin; Kanchanaburi; Lampang; Lumphun; Maha Sarakham; Mukdahan; Nan; Nakhon Phanom; Nakhon Sawan; Phang Nga	Phatthalung; Phetchaburi; Phichit; Phitsanulok; Phuket; Ranong; Sakon Nakhon; Saraburi; Satun; Sisaket; Surin; Trang
Blank				MGI's Drama Projects (The winners became actresses in the dramas produced by the MGI PCL)	Bangkok; Chaiyaphum; Chumphon; Kalasin; Kanchanaburi; Lampang; Lumphun; Maha Sarakham; Mukdahan; Nan; Nakhon Phanom; Nakhon Sawan; Phang Nga	Phatthalung; Phetchaburi; Phichit; Phitsanulok; Phuket; Ranong; Sakon Nakhon; Saraburi; Satun; Sisaket; Surin; Trang
Miss Citra		Miss Sunsilk Treatment		MGI's Drama Projects (The winners became actresses in the dramas produced by the MGI PCL)	Bangkok; Chaiyaphum; Chumphon; Kalasin; Kanchanaburi; Lampang; Lumphun; Maha Sarakham; Mukdahan; Nan; Nakhon Phanom; Nakhon Sawan; Phang Nga	Phatthalung; Phetchaburi; Phichit; Phitsanulok; Phuket; Ranong; Sakon Nakhon; Saraburi; Satun; Sisaket; Surin; Trang
Presenter	Unilever Thailand	Presenter	Sunsilk	MGI's Drama Projects (The winners became actresses in the dramas produced by the MGI PCL)	Bangkok; Chaiyaphum; Chumphon; Kalasin; Kanchanaburi; Lampang; Lumphun; Maha Sarakham; Mukdahan; Nan; Nakhon Phanom; Nakhon Sawan; Phang Nga	Phatthalung; Phetchaburi; Phichit; Phitsanulok; Phuket; Ranong; Sakon Nakhon; Saraburi; Satun; Sisaket; Surin; Trang
Prize	฿100,000 Baht	Prize	฿200,000 Baht	MGI's Drama Projects (The winners became actresses in the dramas produced by the MGI PCL)	Bangkok; Chaiyaphum; Chumphon; Kalasin; Kanchanaburi; Lampang; Lumphun; Maha Sarakham; Mukdahan; Nan; Nakhon Phanom; Nakhon Sawan; Phang Nga	Phatthalung; Phetchaburi; Phichit; Phitsanulok; Phuket; Ranong; Sakon Nakhon; Saraburi; Satun; Sisaket; Surin; Trang
Winner	Phuket	Winner	Chumphon	MGI's Drama Projects (The winners became actresses in the dramas produced by the MGI PCL)	Bangkok; Chaiyaphum; Chumphon; Kalasin; Kanchanaburi; Lampang; Lumphun; Maha Sarakham; Mukdahan; Nan; Nakhon Phanom; Nakhon Sawan; Phang Nga
Blank		Blank		The Grand Concert: Engfa Charlotte	Phichit	Became guest singer in The; Grand Concert: Engfa Charlotte
CHAT's Lucky Girl		Miss 4U2		The Grand Concert: Engfa Charlotte	Phichit	Became guest singer in The; Grand Concert: Engfa Charlotte
Presenter	CHAT Cosmetics	Presenter	4U2 Thailand Co., Ltd.	SmimmingPhu: Bikini on the beach	Chai Nat; Phichit; Chumphon; Phuket; Loei	Saraburi; Mukdahan; Uthai Thani; Nonthaburi
Prize	฿10,000 Baht	Prize	฿50,000 Baht	SmimmingPhu: Bikini on the beach	Chai Nat; Phichit; Chumphon; Phuket; Loei	Saraburi; Mukdahan; Uthai Thani; Nonthaburi
Winner	Chanthaburi	Winner	Phuket	SmimmingPhu: Bikini on the beach	Chai Nat; Phichit; Chumphon; Phuket; Loei	Saraburi; Mukdahan; Uthai Thani; Nonthaburi
Miss Sunsilk		Best Smile		SmimmingPhu: Bikini on the beach	Chai Nat; Phichit; Chumphon; Phuket; Loei
Presenter	Sunsilk	Presenter	D-Dent	SmimmingPhu: Bikini on the beach	Won Special Yacht trip to Phuket
Prize	฿50,000 Baht each	Prize	฿50,000 Baht each
Winners	Phuket; Pathum Thani	Winners	Chumphon; Nonthaburi
Miss Beauty Blooming		Grand Fashion Look
Presenter	Baby Bright Thailand	Presenter	7th Street Thailand
Prize	฿50,000 Baht	Prize	฿50,000 Baht
Winner	Chumphon	Winner	Chumphon
Miss Do-oD Drink Creator		Miss Do-oD Drink
Presenter	Do-oD Drink	Presenter	Do-oD Drink
Prize	฿50,000 Baht	Prize	฿100,000 Baht
Winner	Pathum Thani	Winner	Bangkok
Wink White Beauty Queen		Miss Beautiful Skin
Presenter	Wink White Thailand	Presenter	CHAT Cosmetics
Prize	฿100,000 Baht	Prize	฿100,000 Baht
Winner	Bangkok	Winner	Phuket
Miss Cathy Doll Influencer		Miss Kitty Kawaii Best Seller
Presenter	Cathy Doll Cosmetics	Presenter	Kitty Kawaii
Prize	฿100,000 Baht	Prize	฿100,000 Baht
Winner	Phuket	Winner	Phuket
Friends of Dr. JiLL		CHAT Influencer
Presenter	Dr. JiLL Cosmetics	Presenter	CHAT Cosmetics
Prize	฿100,000 Baht each	Prize	฿100,000 Baht
Winners	Bangkok; Maha Sarakham; Pathum Thani; Phuket; Saraburi	Winner	Phuket

== Sub-contests ==
=== Miss Darling of Phuket ===
Miss Grand Thailand 2024: Miss Darling of Phuket
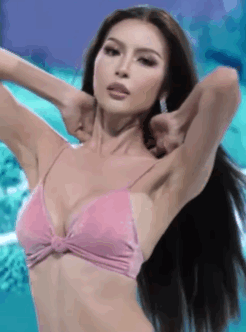
- Kanyaphatsaphon Rungrueang, the winner of the contest
- Date: 19 March 2024
- Presenters: Sakul Limpapanon; Napattarapon Nonjit
- Venue: Saphan Hin 4000 Seat Municipal Stadium, Phuket
- Broadcaster: YouTube
- Entrants: 77
- Placements: 20
- Winner: Kanyaphatsaphon Rungrueang (Pathum Thani)

External videos
- Miss Grand Thailand 2024: Miss Darling of Phuket contest, on March 19, 2024, YouTube video

Miss Darling of Phuket or Miss Darling of the host city (Thai: มิสแกรนด์ขวัญใจภูเก็ต) was one of the six main sub-contests of Miss Grand Thailand 2024, held on 19 March 2024 at the Saphan Hin 4000 Seat Municipal Stadium, Phuket. All 77 provincial representatives participated in the event, which consisted of four rounds: the opening round where the delegates paraded in the Peranakan Chinese wardrobes, followed by the evening gown round, the top 20 round which was elected based on 4-B categories (Beauty, Body, Brain, and Business); the top 20 later competed in the long gown round, where the top 10 were elected. The final 10 qualified for the speech round to determine the top 5, who then faced the question and answer round, where the final winner was elected.

At the end of the event, the representative of Pathum Thani, Kanyaphatsaphon Rungrueang, was announced as the winner and received a ฿200,000 Bath cash prize as the reward. Meanwhile, Yuwaporn Songngam of Bangkok, Malin Chara-anan of Phuket, Aoratai Phangchan of Mahasarakham, and Nattha Intasao of Mukdahan, were named the runners-up.

The event was hosted by Sakul Limpapanon and Napattarapon Nonjit. In addition to the main title, several special awards given by the local sponsors in Phuket were also delivered at the event.

Competition result:

Legend:
B1 Beauty category	B2 Body category
B3 Brain category	B4 Business category

Placement	Contestants
Miss Darling of Phuket	B3 Pathum Thani – Kanyaphatsaphon Rungrueang
1st runner-up	B1 Bangkok – Yuwaporn Songngam (Note: Automatically qualified for the final 5 after winning the Phuket People's Choice Award, determined by the value of product sales on the Line Shopping)
2nd runner-up	B4 Phuket – Malin Chara-anan (Note: Automatically qualified for the final 10 after winning the special track of IDL Grand IDOL)
3rd runner-up	B3 Maha Sarakham – Aoratai Phangchan
4th runner-up	B3 Mukdahan – Nattha Intasao
Top 10	B4 Chumphon – Kittiyaporn Fungmee; B1 Phang Nga – Suphannika Nopharat; B1 Sakon Nakhon – Napapat Rungroj; B4 Saraburi – Suntaree Uan-inth; B1 Satun – Emma Martini
Top 20	B4 Chaiyaphum – Kittiyaporn Lanont; B2 Chonburi – Natthakan Kunchayawanat; B2 Mae Hong Son – Premika Wongkaweewatsurasith; B3 Nakhon Phanom – Sasicha Duangket; B2 Nan – Prakaiphet Umakorn; B1 Nong Bua Lamphu – Aniphan Chalermburanawong; B4 Phichit – Piyarada Wayuwech; B3 Ranong – Natthawikarn Pheukamornkul; B2 Sukhothai – Lapatthida Khongkraphanth; B2 Suphanburi – Kanokwan Nansoongnoen

=== Southern Thai Costume Contest ===
Southern Thai Costume Contest: Renaissance of the South
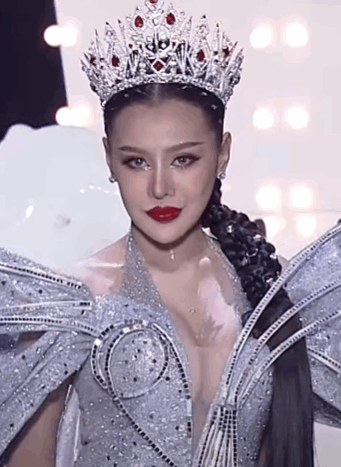
- Piyaporn Suksom, the winner of the contest
- Date: 17 March 2024
- Presenters: Sakul Limpapanon; Napattarapon Nonjit
- Venue: Saphan Hin 4000 Seat Municipal Stadium, Phuket
- Broadcaster: YouTube
- Entrants: 77
- Placements: 10
- Winner: Piyaporn Suksom (Tak)

The contest for the Best Southern Thai Costume award (Thai: การประกวดชุดชาติพันธุ์ภาคใต้) was held in them of Renaissance of the South, at the Saphan Hin 4000 Seat Municipal Stadium, Phuket, on 17 March 2024. All 77 provincial representatives paraded in costumes that reflected the history, culture, beliefs, and way of life of the southern Thai people. The event was hosted by a MGI PCL personnel, Sakul Limpapanon, and a local entrepreneur, Napattarapon Nonjit.

Of all 77 costumes, only 10 qualified for the next round, five of which were chosen by the local panel of judges, while the remaining five were determined by paid voting on an online application called Line Shopping. Each qualified candidate received a ฿10,000 Baht cash prize, while the winning costume, which was directly elected from the final 10 by the judges, received a ฿100,000 Baht cash prize.

The winning costume, The Hungry Ghost of Preta, which was worn by Tak representative Piyaporn Suksom, was inspired by the southern Thai tradition that happened annually during the 10th month of the Thai lunar calendar called 10th month Sat Thai or 10th month Hungry Ghost Festival (ประเพณีชิงเปรต), in which the people make offerings to their ancestors who were believed to have been released from hell to meet their descendants and return at the end of that month.

Competition result:

Legend:
J Qualified for the top 10 by the panel of judges
V Qualified for the top 10 by paid voting

Placement	Contestants
Best Southern Thai Costume	J Tak – Piyaporn Suksom
Top 10	V Bangkok – Yuwaporn Songngam; V Chai Nat – Phoraphak Worasophonphakdee; J Kanchanaburi – Kulthida Thonglert; J Lampang – Thansita Dilhokananskul; V Pathum Thani – Kanyaphatsaphon Rungrueang; V Phuket – Malin Chara-anan; V Saraburi – Suntaree Uan-inth; J Sukhothai – Lapatthida Khongkraphanth; J Surat Thani – Sue Hyeon Yoon

=== Swimsuit Contest ===
Miss Grand Thailand 2024: Swimsuit Contest
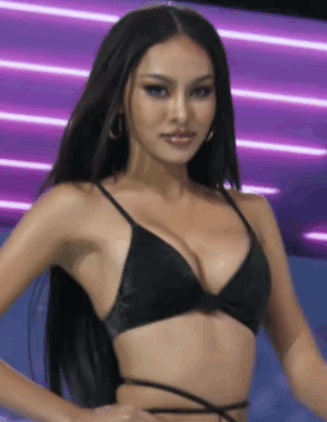
- Kittiyaporn Fungmee, the winner of a special title, La Glace Beabie Vibes.
- Date: 18 March 2024
- Presenters: Sakul Limpapanon; Thaweeporn Phingchamrat
- Venue: Saphan Hin 4000 Seat Municipal Stadium, Phuket
- Broadcaster: YouTube
- Entrants: 77
- Placements: 10
- Winner: Natthakan Kunchayawanat (Chonburi)

The contest for the Best in Swimsuit Award in the Miss Grand Thailand 2024 pageant was held on 18 March 2024, at the Saphan Hin 4000 Seat Municipal Stadium, Phuket. All 77 contestants wore swimwear designed by a Thai cosmetic company, La Glace, and then paraded in front of the panel of judges.

Only ten candidates, five of whom were elected by the judges and another five by online voting, qualified for the battle round, in which they paraded in pairs against each other with former Miss Grand Thailand 2022, Engfa Waraha, as the commentator. Natthakan Kunchayawanat of Chonburi was announced as the winner in the national grand final, held in Bangkok on 6 April 2024.

In addition to the main title, Kittiyaporn Fungmee of Chumphon, was awarded La Glace Beabie Vibes by the sponsor and received a ฿50,000 Baht cash as the reward.

Competition result:

Legend:
J Qualified for the top 10 by the panel of judges
V Qualified for the top 10 by paid voting

Placement	Contestant
Best in Swimsuit	J Chonburi – Natthakan Kunchayawanat
Top 10	J Amnat Charoen – Apicha Yarangsrisakul; V Bangkok – Yuwaporn Songngam; J Chumphon – Kittiyaporn Fungmee; V Maha Sarakham – Aoratai Phangchan; V Pathum Thani – Kanyaphatsaphon Rungrueang; V Phuket – Malin Chara-anan; J Samut Songkhram – Wikanda Khotkham; V Satun – Emma Martini; J Sukhothai – Lapatthida Khongkraphanth

=== National Costume Contest ===
Miss Grand Thailand 2024: National Costume Contest
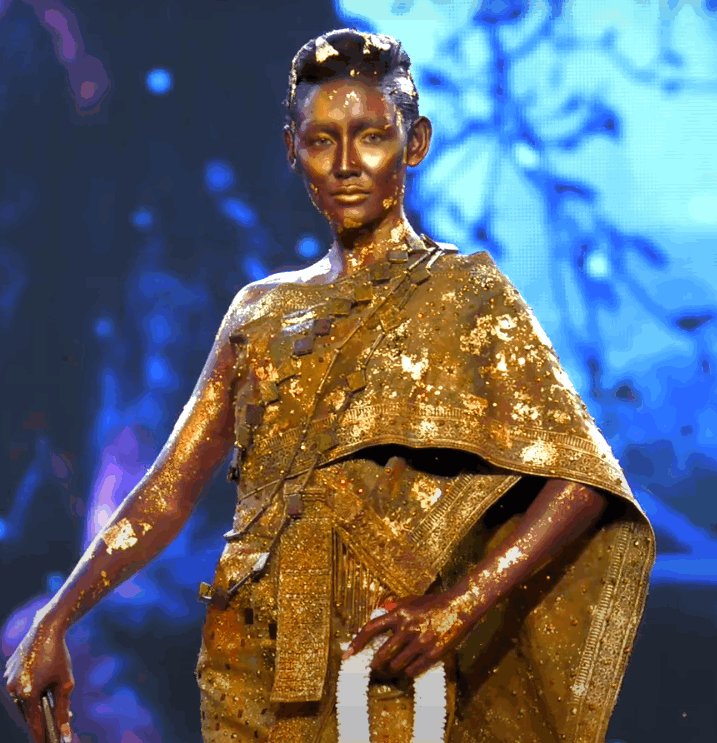
- Winning costume "Thao Suranari," worn by the representative of Nakhon Ratchasima, Nanthicha Yangwatthana
- Date: 30 March 2024
- Venue: MGI Hall, Bravo BKK Mall, Bangkok
- Broadcaster: YouTube
- Entrants: 77
- Placements: 30
- Winner: Nanthicha Yangwatthana (Nakhon Ratchasima)

External videos
- Miss Grand Thailand 2024: National Costume Contest, on March 30, 2024, YouTube video

The National Costume Contest for the Miss Grand Thailand 2024 pageant was held on 30 March 2024 at the MGI Hall, Bravo BKK Mall, Bangkok, and was live-transmitted to the audience worldwide through an MGI YouTube channel named GrandTV. All 77 provincial representatives paraded in costumes that reflected the history, culture, beliefs, and way of life of the people in their respective provinces.

The qualified costumes were selected by a panel of judges and by public voting. The winning costume will be worn by Miss Grand Thailand representatives in the national costume contest when competing internationally. The winning candidate received ฿100,000 Baht cash as a reward, while all nine runners-up received ฿30,000 Baht cash each.

The panel of judges and honored guests included:

- Nawat Itsaragrisil – President of MGI PCL
- Teresa Chaivisut – Vice-president of MGI PCL
- Engfa Waraha – Miss Grand Thailand 2022 and general manager of MGI PCL
- Waranchana Radomlek – Vice-general manager of MGI PCL
- Charlotte Austin – 5th runner-up Miss Grand Thailand 2022
- Thaweeporn Phingchamrat – Miss Grand Thailand 2023
- Pimjira Jaroenlak – 2nd runner-up Miss Grand Thailand 2023
- Ajcharee Srisuk – 3rd runner-up Miss Grand Thailand 2023
- Ketwalee Phobdee – Miss Aura International 2023
- Rina Chatamanchai – 5th runner-up Miss Grand Thailand 2023
- Pattaravadee Boonmesup – 5th runner-up Miss Grand Thailand 2023
- Vanessa Natcha Wenk – 5th runner-up Miss Grand Thailand 2023
- Tantawan Jitteelak – 5th runner-up Miss Grand Thailand 2023
- Kodchakorn Kontrakoon – 5th runner-up Miss Grand Thailand 2023

Competition result:

Legend:
J Qualified for the top 30 by the panel of judges
V Qualified for the top 30 by public voting

Placement	Contestants
Best National Costume	V Nakhon Ratchasima - Nanthicha Yangwatthana
Top 10	J Chaiyaphum - Kittiyaporn Lanont; J Khon Kaen - Kanokporn Muennoi; V Nakhon Nayok - Thippayaporn Akharaphol; J Nakhon Sawan - Sirinthorn Premsekian; J Nong Khai - Pichapa Jinnathikakul; J Samut Prakan - Jesita Aramkham; V Saraburi - Suntaree Uan-inth; V Sisaket - Kritsadaporn Nakhrai; J Suphanburi - Kanokwan Nansoongnoen
Top 30	V Bangkok - Yuwaporn Songngam; V Buriram - Viranya Berry; J Chachoengsao - Kawinta Phrommat; V Chumphon - Kittiyaporn Fungmee; V Kalasin - Alisa Khemnak; J Lamphun - Rattanarapee Thammachaikul; J Mae Hong Son - Premika Wongkaweewatsurasith; V Maha Sarakham - Aoratai Phangchan; V Nakhon Phanom - Sasicha Duangket; V Nong Bua Lamphu - Aniphan Chalermburanawong; V Pathum Thani - Kanyaphatsaphon Rungrueang; J Phatthalung - Prawwara Sataratphayoon; J Phetchabun - Nicharee Sukijprasert; J Phra Nakhon Si Ayutthaya - Jiranath Jirapatpuvanont; V Phuket - Malin Chara-anan; J Rayong - Kuntapath Charusrojthanadech; J Roi Et - Thasupang Decha-akara-anan; V Sakon Nakhon - Napapat Rungroj; V Satun - Emma Martini; J Trang - Narisa Yeesun

=== Miss Grand T-pop Star Contest ===
Miss Grand Thailand 2024: T-pop Star Contest
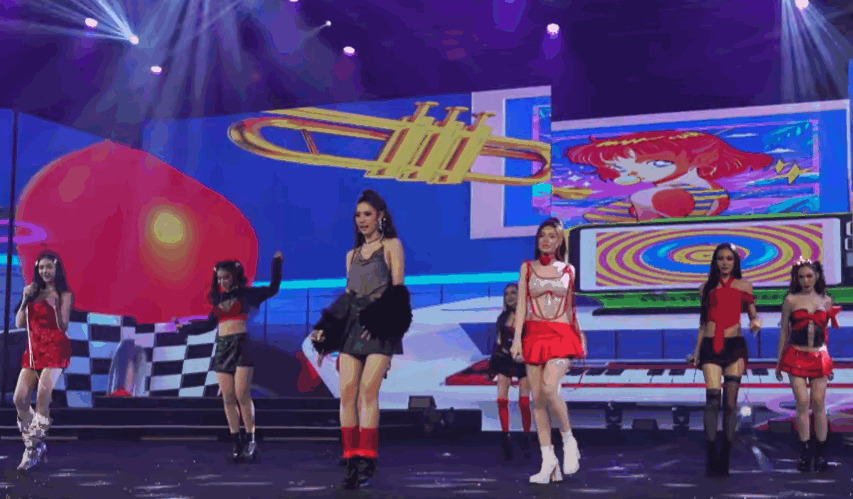
- Miss Grand T-pop Star contestants performed a live performance in the Grand Concert Live in Phuket, held on 20 March 2024 at the Saphan Hin Municipal Stadium, Phuket
- Date: 1 April 2024
- Venue: MGI Hall, Bravo BKK Mall, Bangkok
- Broadcaster: YouTube
- Entrants: 40
- Placements: 24
- Winners: Aoratai Phangchan (Maha Sarakham); Nattha Intasao (Mukdahan); Sasicha Duangket (Nakhon Phanom); Panvasa Kachunram (Phayao); Piyarada Wayuwech (Phichit); Natthawikarn Pheukamornkul (Ranong); Napapat Rungroj (Sakon Nakhon); Emma Martini (Satun)

The Miss Grand T-pop Star Contest was a singing contest searching for six trainees who would be sent, under Miss Grand International PCL, to South Korea to be trained in singing-related skills. It was also considered one of six sub-contests in the Miss Grand Thailand 2024 pageant, whose candidates can voluntarily apply to compete.

Of all the applicants, 40 qualified for the second round through an audition held at the Swissôtel Bangkok Ratchada on March 7, 2024. The number of aspirants was narrowed down by public voting to 24, who later competed in the final round on April 1, 2024, at the MGI Hall, Bravo BKK Mall, Bangkok, where the final 12 were elected. The eight winners, who was announced on 6 April 2024 on the national coronation night of the pageant, received ฿2,000,000 Baht cash as a reward.

The project management team, including:

- Nawat Itsaragrisil – President of Miss Grand International PCL
- Engfa Waraha – Pageant general director
- Chindanai Bhuwakul – Chairperson of E29 Music Identities
- Chatthaporn Wongkhemphet – Senior brand manager of Citra
- Dujthananan Kiatticherdsaengsuk – Brand executive of Kitty Kawaii

Competition result:

Placement	Province/Candidate
Miss Grand T-pop Star	Maha Sarakham – Aoratai Phangchan; Mukdahan – Nattha Intasao; Nakhon Phanom – Sasicha Duangket; Phayao – Panvasa Kachunram; Phichit – Piyarada Wayuwech; Ranong – Natthawikarn Pheukamornkul; Sakon Nakhon – Napapat Rungroj; Satun – Emma Martini
Top 12	Chiang Mai – Pornsupphat Pratumwan; Chumphon – Kittiyaporn Fungmee; Phuket – Malin Chara-anan; Saraburi – Suntaree Uan-inth
Top 24	Bangkok; Chai Nat; Lampang; Pathum Thani; Phang Nga; Phayao; Phatthalung; Roi Et; Rayong; Samut Prakan; Samut Sakhon; Suphanburi; Ubon Ratchathani
Top 40	Krabi; Chaiyaphum; Chiang Rai; Trat; Surin; Trang; Nan; Nakhon Pathom; Nakhon Ratchasima; Nakhon Sawan; Nakhon Si Thammarat; Bueng Kan; Buriram; Prachuap Khiri Khan; Phra Nakhon Si Ayutthaya; Surat Thani; Sa Kaeo; Uthai Thani

== Main pageant ==
In the pageant grand final round held on 6 April 2024, five candidates from each regional group qualified for the top 20 finalists. It was determined through both the preliminary stage held on 3 April and all pre-pageant activities. The top 20 then competed in the swimsuit section. Afterward, two candidates from each group, including the Miss Popular Vote winner determined through public voting, the Best Seller Award winner, and the Boss Choice fast-track winner directly selected by the pageant's president, completed the top 11 finalists that later competed at the evening gown and speech competitions.

After the end of the evening gown and speech sessions, four candidates, together with a new Boss Choice winner, qualified for the top 5 round, where they competed in the question and answer portion where the pageant's winner and all four runners-up were decided.

The summary of the selection process is presented below.

Miss Grand Thailand 2024 selection process

Top 20	Top 11	Top 5	Finals
Boss Choice; 1 candidate	Boss Choice; 1 candidate
Custom Selection; 5 candidates/group	Swimsuit round	Custom selection 2 candidates/group	Evening gown and Speech rounds	Custom selection 1 candidate/group	Question and answer round	Winner; Announcement
Miss Popular Vote; 1 candidate
Best Seller Award; 1 candidate

== Contestants ==
All 77 contestants have been confirmed.

Code	Province	Candidate	Age (Note: Ages at the time of the pageant)	Height	Group	Ref
MGT01	Bangkok	Yuwaporn Songngam	27	1.70 m (5 ft 7 in)	Central	
MGT02	Krabi	Sukchit Pluksakunsap	22	1.70 m (5 ft 7 in)	Southern	
MGT03	Kanchanaburi	Kulthida Thonglert	28	1.82 m (5 ft 11 1/2 in)	Southern	
MGT04	Kalasin	Alisa Khemnak	27	1.70 m (5 ft 7 in)	Northeastern	
MGT05	Kamphaeng Phet	Thitirat Saengdaeng	27	1.67 m (5 ft 5 1/2 in)	Northern	
MGT06	Khon Kaen	Kanokporn Muennoi (Note: Originally crowned the 1st runner-up Miss Grand Khon Kaen 2024 but was promoted to the position after the original winner, Natthinee Thanatpornphinyo, resigned from the title.)	22	1.73 m (5 ft 8 in)	Northeastern	
MGT07	Chanthaburi	Phittiyaporn Phongsawat	22	1.74 m (5 ft 8 1/2 in)	Central	
MGT08	Chachoengsao	Kawinta Phrommat	27	1.69 m (5 ft 6 1/2 in)	Central	
MGT09	Chonburi	Natthakan Kunchayawanat	26	1.74 m (5 ft 8 1/2 in)	Central	
MGT10	Chai Nat	Phoraphak Worasophonphakdee	21	1.60 m (5 ft 3 in)	Central	
MGT11	Chaiyaphum	Kittiyaporn Lanont	25	1.70 m (5 ft 7 in)	Northeastern	
MGT12	Chumphon	Kittiyaporn Fungmee	21	1.70 m (5 ft 7 in)	Southern	
MGT13	Chiang Rai	Pongthiptida Vajidsuwan	24	1.75 m (5 ft 9 in)	Northern	
MGT14	Chiang Mai	Pornsupphat Pratumwal	20	1.70 m (5 ft 7 in)	Northern	
MGT15	Trang	Narisa Yeesun	23	1.69 m (5 ft 6 1/2 in)	Southern	
MGT16	Trat	Kamolchanok Panyana	21	1.68 m (5 ft 6 in)	Central	
MGT17	Tak	Piyaporn Suksom	26	1.70 m (5 ft 7 in)	Northern	
MGT18	Nakhon Nayok	Thippayaporn Akharaphol	28	1.68 m (5 ft 6 in)	Central	
MGT19	Nakhon Pathom	Suwapitcha Sombut	24	1.65 m (5 ft 5 in)	Central	
MGT20	Nakhon Phanom	Sasicha Duangket	25	1.67 m (5 ft 5 1/2 in)	Northeastern	
MGT21	Nakhon Ratchasima	Nanthicha Yangwatthana	29	1.72 m (5 ft 7 1/2 in)	Northeastern	
MGT22	Nakhon Si Thammarat	Waranya Lrthaisong	21	1.74 m (5 ft 8 1/2 in)	Southern	
MGT23	Nakhon Sawan	Sirinthorn Premsekian	21	1.68 m (5 ft 6 in)	Northern	
MGT24	Nonthaburi	Jiraporn Ridaksorn	29	1.65 m (5 ft 5 in)	Central	
MGT25	Narathiwat	Saranrat Kanjanasathian	30	1.66 m (5 ft 5 1/2 in)	Southern	
MGT26	Nan	Prakaiphet Umakorn	29	1.70 m (5 ft 7 in)	Northern	
MGT27	Bueng Kan	Yonrada Wadgana	27	1.65 m (5 ft 5 in)	Northeastern	
MGT28	Buriram	Viranya Berry	25	1.68 m (5 ft 6 in)	Northeastern	
MGT29	Pathum Thani	Kanyaphatsaphon Rungrueang	27	1.73 m (5 ft 8 in)	Central	
MGT30	Prachuap Khiri Khan	Plaifha Thongdonpum	27	1.70 m (5 ft 7 in)	Southern	
MGT31	Prachinburi	Chakriya Vetnitisakul	26	1.65 m (5 ft 5 in)	Central	
MGT32	Pattani	Kwintra Praphasanobon	27	1.68 m (5 ft 6 in)	Southern	
MGT33	Phra Nakhon Si Ayutthaya	Jiranath Jirapatpuvanont	27	1.67 m (5 ft 5 1/2 in)	Central	
MGT34	Phayao	Panvasa Kachunram	21	1.72 m (5 ft 7 1/2 in)	Northern	
MGT35	Phang Nga	Suphannika Nopharat	27	1.72 m (5 ft 7 1/2 in)	Southern	
MGT36	Phatthalung	Prawwara Sataratphayoon	28	1.70 m (5 ft 7 in)	Southern	
MGT37	Phichit	Piyarada Wayuwech	25	1.65 m (5 ft 5 in)	Northern	
MGT38	Phitsanulok	Chutimonth Sangsri-inth	26	1.67 m (5 ft 5 1/2 in)	Northern	
MGT39	Phetchaburi	Pheeraya Phuangsombut	29	1.70 m (5 ft 7 in)	Southern	
MGT40	Phetchabun	Nicharee Sukijprasert	26	1.70 m (5 ft 7 in)	Northern	
MGT41	Phrae	Karnhiran Hirankarn	27	1.72 m (5 ft 7 1/2 in)	Northern	
MGT42	Phuket	Malin Chara-anan	27	1.65 m (5 ft 5 in)	Southern	
MGT43	Maha Sarakham	Aoratai Phangchan	21	1.70 m (5 ft 7 in)	Northeastern	
MGT44	Mukdahan	Nattha Intasao	29	1.64 m (5 ft 4 1/2 in)	Northeastern	
MGT45	Mae Hong Son	Premika Wongkaweewatsurasith	27	1.75 m (5 ft 9 in)	Northern	
MGT46	Yala	Sitanan Nantana	22	1.71 m (5 ft 7 1/2 in)	Southern	
MGT47	Yasothon	Atittiya Sonema	25	1.73 m (5 ft 8 in)	Northeastern	
MGT48	Roi Et	Thasupang Decha-akara-anan	30	1.65 m (5 ft 5 in)	Northeastern	
MGT49	Ranong	Natthawikarn Pheukamornkul (Note: Originally crowned the 1st runner-up Miss Grand Ranong 2024 but was promoted to the position after the original winner, Pailin Wongsa, got pregnant and resigned from the title.)	28	1.67 m (5 ft 5 1/2 in)	Southern	
MGT50	Rayong	Kuntapath Charusrojthanadech	18	1.71 m (5 ft 7 1/2 in)	Central	
MGT51	Ratchaburi	Worawalunh Leelhasuwan	28	1.68 m (5 ft 6 in)	Southern	
MGT52	Lopburi	Nantanaporn Deesamrong	24	1.67 m (5 ft 5 1/2 in)	Central	
MGT53	Lampang	Thansita Dilhokananskul	26	1.78 m (5 ft 10 in)	Northern	
MGT54	Lamphun	Rattanarapee Thammachaikul (Note: Originally crowned the 1st runner-up Miss Grand Lamphun–Lampang 2024 but was promoted to the position after the original winner, Chutiya Jiarakul, withdrew during the competition.)	19	1.71 m (5 ft 7 1/2 in)	Northern	
MGT55	Loei	Phattaraporn Sonthiphak	28	1.75 m (5 ft 9 in)	Northern	
MGT56	Sisaket	Kritsadaporn Nakhrai	24	1.74 m (5 ft 8 1/2 in)	Northeastern	
MGT57	Sakon Nakhon	Napapat Rungroj	19	1.72 m (5 ft 7 1/2 in)	Northeastern	
MGT58	Songkhla	Waranya Mahawan (Note: Originally crowned the 1st runner-up Miss Grand Songkhla 2024 but was promoted to the position after the original winner, Peeraya Puangsombat, was dethroned.)	28	1.69 m (5 ft 6 1/2 in)	Southern	
MGT59	Satun	Emma Martini	17	1.70 m (5 ft 7 in)	Southern	
MGT60	Samut Prakan	Jesita Aramkham	24	1.67 m (5 ft 5 1/2 in)	Central	
MGT61	Samut Songkhram	Wikanda Khotkham	26	1.80 m (5 ft 11 in)	Central	
MGT62	Samut Sakhon	Suchanika Sawok	24	1.67 m (5 ft 5 1/2 in)	Central	
MGT63	Sa Kaeo	Kamolphet Phetwarangkul	27	1.70 m (5 ft 7 in)	Central	
MGT64	Saraburi	Suntaree Uan-inth	24	1.76 m (5 ft 9 1/2 in)	Central	
MGT65	Sing Buri	Alinraphath Srisirirungsimakul	29	1.65 m (5 ft 5 in)	Central	
MGT66	Sukhothai	Lapatthida Khongkraphanth	28	1.77 m (5 ft 9 1/2 in)	Northern	
MGT67	Suphanburi	Kanokwan Nansoongnoen	25	1.70 m (5 ft 7 in)	Central	
MGT68	Surat Thani	Sue Hyeon Yoon	18	1.72 m (5 ft 7 1/2 in)	Southern	
MGT69	Surin	Salina Hodgkiss	23	1.63 m (5 ft 4 in)	Northeastern	
MGT70	Nong Khai	Pichapa Jinnathikakul	27	1.72 m (5 ft 7 1/2 in)	Northeastern	
MGT71	Nong Bua Lamphu	Aniphan Chalermburanawong	30	1.75 m (5 ft 9 in)	Northeastern	
MGT72	Ang Thong	Chutikarn Treetharnthiphakorn	26	1.70 m (5 ft 7 in)	Central	
MGT73	Udon Thani	Aombell Namruethai	25	1.70 m (5 ft 7 in)	Northeastern	
MGT74	Uthai Thani	Tharita Smyth	25	1.69 m (5 ft 6 1/2 in)	Northern	
MGT75	Uttaradit	Oraphan Phetchniam	23	1.70 m (5 ft 7 in)	Northern	
MGT76	Ubon Ratchathani	Patimaporn Kayanchom	25	1.70 m (5 ft 7 in)	Northeastern	
MGT77	Amnat Charoen	Apicha Yarangsrisakul	22	1.75 m (5 ft 9 in)	Northeastern	
