= List of tambon in Thailand (L) =

This is a list of tambon (sub-districts) in Thailand, beginning with the letter L. This information is liable to change due to border changes or re-allocation of Tambons. Missing Tambon numbers show where the number is either not used or the Tambon has been transferred to a different Amphoe.

Tambon (sub-district)	ตำบล	Amphoe (district)	อำเภอ	Changwat (province)	จังหวัด	Region
La-ae	ละแอ	Yaha	ยะหา	Yala	ยะลา	South
La-ai	ละอาย	Chawang	ฉวาง	Nakhon Si Thammarat	นครศรีธรรมราช	South
La-nga	ลางา	Mayo	มายอ	Pattani	ปัตตานี	South
La-ngu	ละงู	La-ngu	ละงู	Satun	สตูล	South
La-o	ละเอาะ	Nam Kliang	น้ำเกลี้ยง	Sisaket	ศรีสะเกษ	North-East
La-un Nuea	ละอุ่นเหนือ	La-un	ละอุ่น	Ranong	ระนอง	South
La-un Tai	ละอุ่นใต้	La-un	ละอุ่น	Ranong	ระนอง	South
Lae	และ	Thung Chang	ทุ่งช้าง	Nan	น่าน	North
Laem	แหลม	Hua Sai	หัวไทร	Nakhon Si Thammarat	นครศรีธรรมราช	South
Laem Bua	แหลมบัว	Nakhon Chai Si	นครชัยศรี	Nakhon Pathom	นครปฐม	Central
Laem Fa Pha	แหลมฟ้าผ่า	Phra Samut Chedi	พระสมุทรเจดีย์	Samut Prakan	สมุทรปราการ	Central
Laem Klat	แหลมกลัด	Mueang Trat	เมืองตราด	Trat	ตราด	East
Laem Ngop	แหลมงอบ	Laem Ngop	แหลมงอบ	Trat	ตราด	East
Laem Phak Bia	แหลมผักเบี้ย	Ban Laem	บ้านแหลม	Phetchaburi	เพชรบุรี	West
Laem Pho	แหลมโพธิ์	Yaring (Malay: Jamu)	ยะหริ่ง	Pattani	ปัตตานี	South
Laem Pradu	แหลมประดู่	Ban Pho	บ้านโพธิ์	Chachoengsao	ฉะเชิงเทรา	East
Laem Rang	แหลมรัง	Bueng Na Rang	บึงนาราง	Phichit	พิจิตร	Central
Laem Sai	แหลมทราย	Lang Suan	หลังสวน	Chumphon	ชุมพร	South
Laem Sak	แหลมสัก	Ao Luek	อ่าวลึก	Krabi	กระบี่	South
Laem Som	แหลมสอม	Palian	ปะเหลียน	Trang	ตรัง	South
Laem Son	แหลมสน	La-ngu	ละงู	Satun	สตูล	South
Laem Talumphuk	แหลมตะลุมพุก	Pak Phanang	ปากพนัง	Nakhon Si Thammarat	นครศรีธรรมราช	South
Laem Tanot	แหลมโตนด	Khuan Khanun	ควนขนุน	Phatthalung	พัทลุง	South
Laem Thong	แหลมทอง	Phakdi Chumphon	ภักดีชุมพล	Chaiyaphum	ชัยภูมิ	North-East
Laem Thong	แหลมทอง	Nong Bun Mak	หนองบุญมาก	Nakhon Ratchasima	นครราชสีมา	North-East
Laem Yai	แหลมใหญ่	Mueang Samut Songkhram	เมืองสมุทรสงคราม	Samut Songkhram	สมุทรสงคราม	Central
Lahan	ละหาร	Sai Buri (Malay: Telube or Selindung Bayu)	สายบุรี	Pattani	ปัตตานี	South
Lahan	ละหาน	Chatturat	จัตุรัส	Chaiyaphum	ชัยภูมิ	North-East
Lahan	ละหาร	Yi-ngo (Malay: Jeringo)	ยี่งอ	Narathiwat	นราธิวาส	South
Lahan	ละหาร	Pluak Daeng	ปลวกแดง	Rayong	ระยอง	East
Lahan	ละหาร	Bang Bua Thong	บางบัวทอง	Nonthaburi	นนทบุรี	Central
Lahan Na	ละหานนา	Waeng Noi	แวงน้อย	Khon Kaen	ขอนแก่น	North-East
Lahan Pla Khao	ละหานปลาค้าว	Mueang Yang	เมืองยาง	Nakhon Ratchasima	นครราชสีมา	North-East
Lahan Sai	ละหานทราย	Lahan Sai	ละหานทราย	Buriram	บุรีรัมย์	North-East
Lai Hin	ไหล่หิน	Ko Kha	เกาะคา	Lampang	ลำปาง	North
Lai Nan	ไหล่น่าน	Wiang Sa	เวียงสา	Nan	น่าน	North
Lai Ngao	หล่ายงาว	Wiang Kaen	เวียงแก่น	Chiang Rai	เชียงราย	North
Lai Thung	ไหล่ทุ่ง	Trakan Phuet Phon	ตระการพืชผล	Ubon Ratchathani	อุบลราชธานี	North-East
Laiwo	ไล่โว่	Sangkhla Buri	สังขละบุรี	Kanchanaburi	กาญจนบุรี	West
Lak Chang	หลักช้าง	Chang Klang	ช้างกลาง	Nakhon Si Thammarat	นครศรีธรรมราช	South
Lak Dan	หลักด่าน	Nam Nao	น้ำหนาว	Phetchabun	เพชรบูรณ์	Central
Lak Fa	หลักฟ้า	Chaiyo	ไชโย	Ang Thong	อ่างทอง	Central
Lak Hok	หลักหก	Mueang Pathum Thani	เมืองปทุมธานี	Pathum Thani	ปทุมธานี	Central
Lak Kaeo	หลักแก้ว	Wiset Chai Chan	วิเศษชัยชาญ	Ang Thong	อ่างทอง	Central
Lak Khet	หลักเขต	Mueang Buriram	เมืองบุรีรัมย์	Buriram	บุรีรัมย์	North-East
Lak Liam	หลักเหลี่ยม	Na Mon	นามน	Kalasin	กาฬสินธุ์	North-East
Lak Mueang	หลักเมือง	Kamalasai	กมลาไสย	Kalasin	กาฬสินธุ์	North-East
Lak Sam	หลักสาม	Ban Phaeo	บ้านแพ้ว	Samut Sakhon	สมุทรสาคร	Central
Lak Song	หลักสอง	Khet Bang Khae	บางแค	Bangkok	กรุงเทพมหานคร	Central
Lak Song	หลักสอง	Ban Phaeo	บ้านแพ้ว	Samut Sakhon	สมุทรสาคร	Central
Lakchai	หลักชัย	Lat Bua Luang	ลาดบัวหลวง	Phra Nakhon Si Ayutthaya	พระนครศรีอยุธยา	Central
Lalai	ละลาย	Kantharalak	กันทรลักษ์	Sisaket	ศรีสะเกษ	North-East
Lalo	ลาโละ	Rueso (Malay: Rusa)	รือเสาะ	Narathiwat	นราธิวาส	South
Lalom Mai Phatthana	ละลมใหม่พัฒนา	Chok Chai	โชคชัย	Nakhon Ratchasima	นครราชสีมา	North-East
Lalom	ละลม	Benchalak	เบญจลักษ์	Sisaket	ศรีสะเกษ	North-East
Lalom	ละลม	Phu Sing	ภูสิงห์	Sisaket	ศรีสะเกษ	North-East
Laluat	ละลวด	Chamni	ชำนิ	Buriram	บุรีรัมย์	North-East
Lam Chi	ลำชี	Khong Chai	ฆ้องชัย	Kalasin	กาฬสินธุ์	North-East
Lam Hoei	ลำเหย	Don Tum	ดอนตูม	Nakhon Pathom	นครปฐม	Central
Lam Huai Lua	ลำห้วยหลัว	Somdet	สมเด็จ	Kalasin	กาฬสินธุ์	North-East
Lam Kaen	ลำแก่น	Thai Mueang	ท้ายเหมือง	Phang Nga	พังงา	South
Lam Khlong	ลำคลอง	Mueang Kalasin	เมืองกาฬสินธุ์	Kalasin	กาฬสินธุ์	North-East
Lam Kho Hong	ลำคอหงษ์	Non Sung	โนนสูง	Nakhon Ratchasima	นครราชสีมา	North-East
Lam Liang	ลำเลียง	Kra Buri	กระบุรี	Ranong	ระนอง	South
Lam Luk Bua	ลำลูกบัว	Don Tum	ดอนตูม	Nakhon Pathom	นครปฐม	Central
Lam Luk Ka	ลำลูกกา	Lam Luk Ka	ลำลูกกา	Pathum Thani	ปทุมธานี	Central
Lam Mai	ลำใหม่	Mueang Yala	เมืองยะลา	Yala	ยะลา	South
Lam Mun	ลำมูล	Non Sung	โนนสูง	Nakhon Ratchasima	นครราชสีมา	North-East
Lam Nang Kaeo	ลำนางแก้ว	Pak Thong Chai	ปักธงชัย	Nakhon Ratchasima	นครราชสีมา	North-East
Lam Nang Rong	ลำนางรอง	Non Din Daeng	โนนดินแดง	Buriram	บุรีรัมย์	North-East
Lam Narai	ลำนารายณ์	Chai Badan	ชัยบาดาล	Lopburi	ลพบุรี	Central
Lam Nong Saen	ลำหนองแสน	Nong Kung Si	หนองกุงศรี	Kalasin	กาฬสินธุ์	North-East
Lam Pao	ลำปาว	Mueang Kalasin	เมืองกาฬสินธุ์	Kalasin	กาฬสินธุ์	North-East
Lam Phak Chi	ลำผักชี	Khet Nong Chok	หนองจอก	Bangkok	กรุงเทพมหานคร	Central
Lam Phak Kut	ลำผักกูด	Thanyaburi	ธัญบุรี	Pathum Thani	ปทุมธานี	Central
Lam Phan	ลำพาน	Mueang Kalasin	เมืองกาฬสินธุ์	Kalasin	กาฬสินธุ์	North-East
Lam Phaya	ลำพญา	Bang Len	บางเลน	Nakhon Pathom	นครปฐม	Central
Lam Phaya	ลำพยา	Mueang Nakhon Pathom	เมืองนครปฐม	Nakhon Phanom	นครพนม	North-East
Lam Phaya	ลำพะยา	Mueang Yala	เมืองยะลา	Yala	ยะลา	South
Lam Phaya Klang	ลำพญากลาง	Muak Lek	มวกเหล็ก	Saraburi	สระบุรี	Central
Lam Phayon	ลำพยนต์	Tak Fa	ตากฟ้า	Nakhon Sawan	นครสวรรค์	Central
Lam Phi	ลำภี	Thai Mueang	ท้ายเหมือง	Phang Nga	พังงา	South
Lam Phiak	ลำเพียก	Khon Buri	ครบุรี	Nakhon Ratchasima	นครราชสีมา	North-East
Lam Phlai	ลำไพล	Thepha (Malay: Tiba)	เทพา	Songkhla	สงขลา	South
Lam Pho	ลำโพ	Bang Bua Thong	บางบัวทอง	Nonthaburi	นนทบุรี	Central
Lam Phu	ลำภู	Mueang Nongbua Lamphu	เมืองหนองบัวลำภู	Nong Bua Lamphu	หนองบัวลำภู	North-East
Lam Phu	ลำภู	Mueang Narathiwat	เมืองนราธิวาส	Narathiwat	นราธิวาส	South
Lam Pla Thio	ลำปลาทิว	Khet Lat Krabang	ลาดกระบัง	Bangkok	กรุงเทพมหานคร	Central
Lam Plai Mat	ลำปลายมาศ	Lam Plai Mat	ลำปลายมาศ	Buriram	บุรีรัมย์	North-East
Lam Prada	ลำประดา	Bang Mun Nak	บางมูลนาก	Phichit	พิจิตร	Central
Lam Sai	ลำไทร	Wang Noi	วังน้อย	Phra Nakhon Si Ayutthaya	พระนครศรีอยุธยา	Central
Lam Sai	ลำไทร	Lam Luk Ka	ลำลูกกา	Pathum Thani	ปทุมธานี	Central
Lam Sai Yong	ลำไทรโยง	Nang Rong	นางรอง	Buriram	บุรีรัมย์	North-East
Lam Sin	ลำสินธุ์	Srinagarindra	ศรีนครินทร์	Phatthalung	พัทลุง	South
Lam Somphung	ลำสมพุง	Muak Lek	มวกเหล็ก	Saraburi	สระบุรี	Central
Lam Sonthi	ลำสนธิ	Lam Sonthi	ลำสนธิ	Lopburi	ลพบุรี	Central
Lam Ta Sao	ลำตาเสา	Wang Noi	วังน้อย	Phra Nakhon Si Ayutthaya	พระนครศรีอยุธยา	Central
Lam Takhian	ลำตะเคียน	Phak Hai	ผักไห่	Phra Nakhon Si Ayutthaya	พระนครศรีอยุธยา	Central
Lam Thap	ลำทับ	Lam Thap	ลำทับ	Krabi	กระบี่	South
Lam Toiting	ลำต้อยติ่ง	Khet Nong Chok	หนองจอก	Bangkok	กรุงเทพมหานคร	Central
Lamae	ละแมละแม	Lamae	ละแม	Chumphon	ชุมพร	South
Lamduan	ลำดวน	Lamduan	ลำดวน	Surin	สุรินทร์	North-East
Lamduan	ลำดวน	Krasang	กระสัง	Buriram	บุรีรัมย์	North-East
Lamet	เลม็ด	Chaiya	ไชยา	Surat Thani	สุราษฎร์ธานี	South
Lamo	ละมอ	Na Yong	นาโยง	Trang	ตรัง	South
Lampam	ลำปำ	Mueang Phatthalung	เมืองพัทลุง	Phatthalung	พัทลุง	South
Lampang Luang	ลำปางหลวง	Ko Kha	เกาะคา	Lampang	ลำปาง	North
Lamphu Ra	ลำภูรา	Huai Yot	ห้วยยอด	Trang	ตรัง	South
Lamphun	ลำพูน	Ban Nà Sản	บ้านนาสาร	Surat Thani	สุราษฎร์ธานี	South
Lan Ba	ลานบ่า	Lom Sak	หล่มสัก	Phetchabun	เพชรบูรณ์	Central
Lan Dokmai	ลานดอกไม้	Mueang Kamphaeng Phet	เมืองกำแพงเพชร	Kamphaeng Phet	กำแพงเพชร	Central
Lan Dokmai Tok	ลานดอกไม้ตก	Kosamphi Nakhon	โกสัมพีนคร	Kamphaeng Phet	กำแพงเพชร	Central
Lan Hoi	ลานหอย	Ban Dan Lan Hoi	บ้านด่านลานหอย	Sukhothai	สุโขทัย	Central
Lan Khoi	ลานข่อย	Pa Phayom	ป่าพะยอม	Phatthalung	พัทลุง	South
Lan Krabue	ลานกระบือ	Lan Krabue	ลานกระบือ	Kamphaeng Phet	กำแพงเพชร	Central
Lan Sak	ลานสัก	Lan Sak	ลานสัก	Uthai Thani	อุทัยธานี	Central
Lan Saka	ลานสกา	Lan Saka	ลานสกา	Nakhon Si Thammarat	นครศรีธรรมราช	South
Lan Sakae	ลานสะแก	Phayakkhaphum Phisai	พยัคฆภูมิพิสัย	Maha Sarakham	มหาสารคาม	North-East
Lang Suan	หลังสวน	Lang Suan	หลังสวน	Chumphon	ชุมพร	South
Lan Tak Fa	ลานตากฟ้า	Nakhon Chai Si	นครชัยศรี	Nakhon Pathom	นครปฐม	Central
Lao	เหล่า	Thung Khao Luang	ทุ่งเขาหลวง	Roi Et	ร้อยเอ็ด	North-East
Lao	เหล่า	Kosum Phisai	โกสุมพิสัย	Maha Sarakham	มหาสารคาม	North-East
Lao Bok	เหล่าบก	Muang Sam Sip	ม่วงสามสิบ	Ubon Ratchathani	อุบลราชธานี	North-East
Lao Bua Ban	เหล่าบัวบาน	Chiang Yuen	เชียงยืน	Maha Sarakham	มหาสารคาม	North-East
Lao Daeng	เหล่าแดง	Don Mot Daeng	ดอนมดแดง	Ubon Ratchathani	อุบลราชธานี	North-East
Lao Dok Mai	เหล่าดอกไม้	Chuen Chom	ชื่นชม	Maha Sarakham	มหาสารคาม	North-East
Lao Hai Ngam	เหล่าไฮงาม	Kuchinarai	กุฉินารายณ์	Kalasin	กาฬสินธุ์	North-East
Lao Khwan	เลาขวัญ	Lao Khwan	เลาขวัญ	Kanchanaburi	กาญจนบุรี	West
Lao Klang	เหล่ากลาง	Khong Chai	ฆ้องชัย	Kalasin	กาฬสินธุ์	North-East
Lao Ko Hok	เหล่ากอหก	Na Haeo	นาแห้ว	Loei	เลย	North-East
Lao Kwang	เหล่ากวาง	Non Khun	โนนคูน	Sisaket	ศรีสะเกษ	North-East
Lao Luang	เหล่าหลวง	Kaset Wisai	เกษตรวิสัย	Roi Et	ร้อยเอ็ด	North-East
Lao Mi	เหล่าหมี	Don Tan	ดอนตาล	Mukdahan	มุกดาหาร	North-East
Lao Ngam	เหล่างาม	Pho Sai	โพธิ์ไทร	Ubon Ratchathani	อุบลราชธานี	North-East
Lao Noi	เหล่าน้อย	Selaphum	เสลภูมิ	Roi Et	ร้อยเอ็ด	North-East
Lao Oi	เหล่าอ้อย	Rong Kham	ร่องคำ	Kalasin	กาฬสินธุ์	North-East
Lao Phatthana	เหล่าพัฒนา	Na Wa	นาหว้า	Nakhon Phanom	นครพนม	North-East
Lao Phon Kho	เหล่าโพนค้อ	Khok Si Suphan	โคกศรีสุพรรณ	Sakon Nakhon	สกลนคร	North-East
Lao Phruan	เหล่าพรวน	Mueang Amnat Charoen	เมืองอำนาจเจริญ	Amnat Charoen	อำนาจเจริญ	North-East
Lao Po Daeng	เหล่าปอแดง	Mueang Sakon Nakhon	เมืองสกลนคร	Sakon Nakhon	สกลนคร	North-East
Lao Sang Tho	เหล่าสร้างถ่อ	Khamcha-i	คำชะอี	Mukdahan	มุกดาหาร	North-East
Lao Suea Kok	เหล่าเสือโก้ก	Lao Suea Kok	เหล่าเสือโก้ก	Ubon Ratchathani	อุบลราชธานี	North-East
Lao Tang Kham	เหล่าต่างคำ	Phon Phisai	โพนพิสัย	Nong Khai	หนองคาย	North-East
Lao Thong	เหล่าทอง	So Phisai	โซ่พิสัย	Bueng Kan	บึงกาฬ	North-East
Lao Thong	เหล่าทอง	So Phisai	โซ่พิสัย	Nong Khai	หนองคาย	North-East
Lao Yai	เหล่าใหญ่	Kuchinarai	กุฉินารายณ์	Kalasin	กาฬสินธุ์	North-East
Lao Yao	เหล่ายาว	Ban Hong	บ้านโฮ่ง	Lamphun	ลำพูน	North
Lat Bua Khao	ลาดบัวขาว	Ban Pong	บ้านโป่ง	Ratchaburi	ราชบุรี	West
Lat Bua Khao	ลาดบัวขาว	Sikhio	สีคิ้ว	Nakhon Ratchasima	นครราชสีมา	North-East
Lat Bua Luang	ลาดบัวหลวง	Lat Bua Luang	ลาดบัวหลวง	Phra Nakhon Si Ayutthaya	พระนครศรีอยุธยา	Central
Lat Chit	ลาดชิด	Phak Hai	ผักไห่	Phra Nakhon Si Ayutthaya	พระนครศรีอยุธยา	Central
Lat Khae	ลาดแค	Chon Daen	ชนแดน	Phetchabun	เพชรบูรณ์	Central
Lat Khang	ลาดค่าง	Phu Ruea	ภูเรือ	Loei	เลย	North-East
Lat Khwai	ลาดควาย	Si Mueang Mai	ศรีเมืองใหม่	Ubon Ratchathani	อุบลราชธานี	North-East
Lat Khwang	ลาดขวาง	Ban Pho	บ้านโพธิ์	Chachoengsao	ฉะเชิงเทรา	East
Lat Krabang	ลาดกระบัง	Khet Lat Krabang	ลาดกระบัง	Bangkok	กรุงเทพมหานคร	Central
Lat Krathing	ลาดกระทิง	Sanam Chai Khet	สนามชัยเขต	Chachoengsao	ฉะเชิงเทรา	East
Lat Lum Kaeo	ลาดหลุมแก้ว	Lat Lum Kaeo	ลาดหลุมแก้ว	Pathum Thani	ปทุมธานี	Central
Lat Nam Khem	ลาดน้ำเค็ม	Phak Hai	ผักไห่	Phra Nakhon Si Ayutthaya	พระนครศรีอยุธยา	Central
Lat Phatthana	ลาดพัฒนา	Mueang Maha Sarakham	เมืองมหาสารคาม	Maha Sarakham	มหาสารคาม	North-East
Lat Pho	ลาดโพธิ์	Ban Lat	บ้านลาด	Phetchaburi	เพชรบุรี	West
Lat Phrao	ลาดพร้าว	Khet Lat Phrao	ลาดพร้าว	Bangkok	กรุงเทพมหานคร	Central
Lat Sali	ลาดสาลี่	Tha Wung	ท่าวุ้ง	Lopburi	ลพบุรี	Central
Lat Sawai	ลาดสวาย	Lam Luk Ka	ลำลูกกา	Pathum Thani	ปทุมธานี	Central
Lat Takhian	ลาดตะเคียน	Kabin Buri	กบินทร์บุรี	Prachin Buri	ปราจีนบุรี	East
Lat Thippharot	ลาดทิพรส	Takhli	ตาคลี	Nakhon Sawan	นครสวรรค์	Central
Lat Ya	ลาดหญ้า	Mueang Kanchanaburi	เมืองกาญจนบุรี	Kanchanaburi	กาญจนบุรี	West
Lat Yai	ลาดใหญ่	Mueang Chaiyaphum	เมืองชัยภูมิ	Chaiyaphum	ชัยภูมิ	North-East
Lat Yai	ลาดใหญ่	Mueang Samut Songkhram	เมืองสมุทรสงคราม	Samut Songkhram	สมุทรสงคราม	Central
Lat Yao	ลาดยาว	Khet Chatuchak	จตุจักร	Bangkok	กรุงเทพมหานคร	Central
Lat Yao	ลาดยาว	Lat Yao	ลาดยาว	Nakhon Sawan	นครสวรรค์	Central
Lathai	ละทาย	Kanthararom	กันทรารมย์	Sisaket	ศรีสะเกษ	North-East
Lawia	ละเวี้ย	Prakhon Chai	ประโคนชัย	Buriram	บุรีรัมย์	North-East
Le	เหล	Kapong	กะปง	Phang Nga	พังงา	South
Li	ลี้	Li	ลี้	Lamphun	ลำพูน	North
Li Phang	ลิพัง	Palian	ปะเหลียน	Trang	ตรัง	South
Lidon	ลิดล	Mueang Yala	เมืองยะลา	Yala	ยะลา	South
Lilet	ลีเล็ด	Phunphin	พุนพิน	Surat Thani	สุราษฎร์ธานี	South
Lin Fa	ลิ้นฟ้า	Chaturaphak Phiman	จตุรพักตรพิมาน	Roi Et	ร้อยเอ็ด	North-East
Lin Fa	ลิ้นฟ้า	Yang Chum Noi	ยางชุมน้อย	Sisaket	ศรีสะเกษ	North-East
Linthin	ลิ่นถิ่น	Thong Pha Phum	ทองผาภูมิ	Kanchanaburi	กาญจนบุรี	West
Lipa Noi	ลิปะน้อย	Ko Samui	เกาะสมุย	Surat Thani	สุราษฎร์ธานี	South
Lipa Sa-ngo	ลิปะสะโง	Nong Chik	หนองจิก	Pattani	ปัตตานี	South
Lo	ลอ	Chun	จุน	Phayao	พะเยา	North
Lo Yung	หล่อยูง	Takua Thung	ตะกั่วทุ่ง	Phang Nga	พังงา	South
Lochut	โละจูด	Waeng	แว้ง	Narathiwat	นราธิวาส	South
Loei Wang Sai	เลยวังไสย์	Phu Luang	ภูหลวง	Loei	เลย	North-East
Loeng Faek	เลิงแฝก	Kut Rang	กุดรัง	Maha Sarakham	มหาสารคาม	North-East
Loeng Tai	เลิงใต้	Kosum Phisai	โกสุมพิสัย	Maha Sarakham	มหาสารคาม	North-East
Lom Kao	หล่มเก่า	Lom Kao	หล่มเก่า	Phetchabun	เพชรบูรณ์	Central
Lom Khom	ลอมคอม	Phon	พล	Khon Kaen	ขอนแก่น	North-East
Lom Raat	ล้อมแรด	Thoen	เถิน	Lampang	ลำปาง	North
Lom Sak	ลมศักดิ์	Khukhan	ขุขันธ์	Sisaket	ศรีสะเกษ	North-East
Lom Sak	หล่มสัก	Lom Sak	หล่มสัก	Phetchabun	เพชรบูรณ์	Central
Long Khot	โหล่งขอด	Phrao	พร้าว	Chiang Mai	เชียงใหม่	North
Luang Nuea	ลวงเหนือ	Doi Saket	ดอยสะเก็ด	Chiang Mai	เชียงใหม่	North
Luang Nuea	หลวงเหนือ	Ngao	งาว	Lampang	ลำปาง	North
Luang Tai	หลวงใต้	Ngao	งาว	Lampang	ลำปาง	North
Lubo Baya	ลุโบะบายะ	Yi-ngo (Malay: Jeringo)	ยี่งอ	Narathiwat	นราธิวาส	South
Lubo Buesa	ลุโบะบือซา	Yi-ngo (Malay: Jeringo)	ยี่งอ	Narathiwat	นราธิวาส	South
Lubo Sawo	ลุโบะสาวอ	Bacho (Malay: Bahcok)	บาเจาะ	Narathiwat	นราธิวาส	South
Lubo Yirai	ลุโบะยิไร	Mayo	มายอ	Pattani	ปัตตานี	South
Lue	ลือ	Pathum Ratchawongsa	ปทุมราชวงศา	Amnat Charoen	อำนาจเจริญ	North-East
Lum Din	หลุมดิน	Mueang Ratchaburi	เมืองราชบุรี	Ratchaburi	ราชบุรี	West
Lum Khao	หลุมข้าว	Khok Samrong	โคกสำโรง	Lopburi	ลพบุรี	Central
Lum Khao	หลุมข้าว	Non Sung	โนนสูง	Nakhon Ratchasima	นครราชสีมา	North-East
Lum Khao	หลุมเข้า	Nong Khayang	หนองขาหย่าง	Uthai Thani	อุทัยธานี	Central
Lum Lamchi	ลุ่มลำชี	Ban Khwao	บ้านเขว้า	Chaiyaphum	ชัยภูมิ	North-East
Lum Rang	หลุมรัง	Bo Phloi	บ่อพลอย	Kanchanaburi	กาญจนบุรี	West
Lum Rawi	ลุ่มระวี	Chom Phra	จอมพระ	Surin	สุรินทร์	North-East
Lum Sum	ลุ่มสุ่ม	Sai Yok	ไทรโยค	Kanchanaburi	กาญจนบุรี	West
Lumphini	ลุมพินี	Khet Pathum Wan	ปทุมวัน	Bangkok	กรุงเทพมหานคร	Central
Lumphli	ลุมพลี	Phra Nakhon Si Ayutthaya	พระนครศรีอยุธยา	Phra Nakhon Si Ayutthaya	พระนครศรีอยุธยา	Central
Lumpuk	ลุมปุ๊ก	Mueang Buriram	เมืองบุรีรัมย์	Buriram	บุรีรัมย์	North-East
Lung Khwao	ลุงเขว้า	Nong Bun Mak	หนองบุญมาก	Nakhon Ratchasima	นครราชสีมา	North-East
Lung Pradu	หลุ่งประดู่	Huai Thalaeng	ห้วยแถลง	Nakhon Ratchasima	นครราชสีมา	North-East
Lung Takhian	หลุ่งตะเคียน	Huai Thalaeng	ห้วยแถลง	Nakhon Ratchasima	นครราชสีมา	North-East
Lup	หลุบ	Mueang Kalasin	เมืองกาฬสินธุ์	Kalasin	กาฬสินธุ์	North-East
Lup Kha	หลุบคา	Kaeng Khro	แก้งคร้อ	Chaiyaphum	ชัยภูมิ	North-East
Lup Lao	หลุบเลา	Phu Phan	ภูพาน	Sakon Nakhon	สกลนคร	North-East

== See also ==
- Organization of the government of Thailand
- List of districts of Thailand
- List of districts of Bangkok
- List of tambon in Thailand
- Provinces of Thailand
- List of municipalities in Thailand
