= Kalasin (disambiguation) =

Kalasin may refer to

- the town Kalasin in Thailand
- Kalasin Province in Thailand
- Mueang Kalasin district, the capital district of Kalasin Province
