= Phon Thong district =

Phon Thong โพนทอง
- District
- District location in Roi Et province
- Coordinates: 16°18′0″N 103°58′41″E
- Country: Thailand
- Province: Roi Et
- Seat: Waeng

Area
  - Total: 719.2 km^{2} (277.7 sq mi)

Population (2005)
  - Total: 108,348
  - Density: 150.7/km^{2} (390/sq mi)
- Time zone: UTC+7 (ICT)
- Postal code: 45110
- Geocode: 4507

Phon Thong (Thai: โพนทอง, pronounced [pʰōːn tʰɔ̄ːŋ]; Northeastern Thai: โพนทอง, pronounced [pʰôːn tʰôːŋ]) is a district (amphoe) in the northern part of Roi Et province, Thailand.

== Geography ==
Neighbouring districts are (from the east clockwise): Moei Wadi, Nong Phok, Selaphum, Pho Chai of Roi Et Province, and Kuchinarai of Kalasin province. The area is famous for the Laem Phayom State Park and the Wat Pa Anantaram place of worship.

== History ==
The district was created on 23 November 1919, consisting of two tambons from Selaphum District, two from Kamalasai and two from Kuchinarai. Another tambon was taken from Din Daeng District, which was abolished on the same day. The other six tambons from Din Daeng were assigned to Saeng Badan District (now a subdistrict in Somdet district).

In 1939 the district, as well as the main tambon, were renamed Waeng. The district name was changed back to Phon Thong in 1953.

== Administration ==
The district is divided into 14 sub-districts (tambons), which are further subdivided into 190 villages (mubans). Phon Thong is a sub-district municipality (thesaban tambon) which covers parts of tambons Waeng and Sa Nokkaeo. There are a further 14 tambon administrative organizations (TAO).

No.	Name	Thai name	Villages	Pop.
1.	Waeng	แวง	12	10,695
2.	Khok Kok Muang	โคกกกม่วง	12	5,965
3.	Na Udom	นาอุดม	17	6,746
4.	Sawang	สว่าง	12	7,566
5.	Nong Yai	หนองใหญ่	15	11,462
6.	Pho Thong	โพธิ์ทอง	17	10,092
7.	Non Chai Si	โนนชัยศรี	18	9,648
8.	Pho Si Sawang	โพธิ์ศรีสว่าง	13	5,365
9.	Um Mao	อุ่มเม่า	12	5,387
10.	Kham Na Di	คำนาดี	12	8,656
11.	Phrom Sawan	พรมสวรรค์	11	5,529
12.	Sa Nok Kaeo	สระนกแก้ว	15	8,119
13.	Wang Samakkhi	วังสามัคคี	11	7,441
14.	Khok Sung	โคกสูง	13	5,677
