= Chiang Khwan district =

Chiang Khwan เชียงขวัญ
- District
- District location in Roi Et province
- Coordinates: 16°9′56″N 103°45′7″E
- Country: Thailand
- Province: Roi Et
- Seat: Phra That

Area
  - Total: 127.2 km^{2} (49.1 sq mi)

Population (2005)
  - Total: 27,859
  - Density: 219/km^{2} (570/sq mi)
- Time zone: UTC+7 (ICT)
- Postal code: 45000
- Geocode: 4518

Chiang Khwan (Thai: เชียงขวัญ, pronounced [tɕʰīaŋ kʰwǎn]; Northeastern Thai: เซียงขวัญ, pronounced [sîaŋ kʰwǎn]) is a district (amphoe) of Roi Et province, Thailand.

== Geography ==
Neighboring districts are (from the north clockwise): Pho Chai, Selaphum, Thawat Buri, Mueang Roi Et, and Changhan of Roi Et Province, and Rong Kham of Kalasin province.

== History ==
The minor district (king amphoe) was created on 30 April 1994, when six tambons were split off from Thawat Buri district.

The Thai government on 15 May 2007 upgraded all 81 minor districts to full districts. With publication in the Royal Gazette on 24 August, the upgrade became official.

== Administration ==
The district is divided into six sub-districts (tambons), which are further subdivided into 66 villages (mubans). There are no municipal (thesaban) areas; there are six tambon administrative organization (TAO).

No.	Name	Thai name	Villages	Pop.
1.	Chiang Khwan	เชียงขวัญ	12	4,666
2.	Phlapphla	พลับพลา	11	4,807
3.	Phra That	พระธาตุ	8	2,495
4.	Phra Chao	พระเจ้า	12	4,714
5.	Mu Mon	หมูม้น	10	4,727
6.	Ban Khueang	บ้านเขือง	13	6,450
