= Moei Wadi district =

Moei Wadi เมยวดี
- District
- District location in Roi Et province
- Coordinates: 16°23′21″N 104°9′27″E
- Country: Thailand
- Province: Roi Et

Area
  - Total: 180.59 km^{2} (69.73 sq mi)

Population (2005)
  - Total: 22,463
  - Density: 124.4/km^{2} (322/sq mi)
- Time zone: UTC+7 (ICT)
- Postal code: 45250
- Geocode: 4515

Moei Wadi (Thai: เมยวดี, pronounced [mɤ̄ːj wā.dīː]; Northeastern Thai: เมยวดี, pronounced [mɤ̂ːj wā.dìː]) is a district (amphoe) in the northern part of Roi Et province, northeastern Thailand.

== Geography ==
Neighboring districts are (from the east clockwise): Nong Phok and Phon Thong of Roi Et Province; Kuchinarai of Kalasin province; and Nong Sung of Mukdahan province.

== History ==
The minor district (king amphoe) Moei Wadi was established on 1 April 1978, when the two tambons, Moei Wadi and Chumphon, were split off from Phon Thong district. It was upgraded to a full district on 3 November 1993.

== Administration ==
The district is divided into four sub-districts (tambons), which are further subdivided into 43 villages (mubans). There are no municipal (thesabans); there are four tambon administrative organizations (TAO).

| No. | Name | Thai name | Villages | Pop. |
|---|---|---|---|---|
| 1. | Moei Wadi | เมยวดี | 11 | 5,609 |
| 2. | Chumphon | ชุมพร | 14 | 7,823 |
| 3. | Bung Loet | บุ่งเลิศ | 9 | 4,852 |
| 4. | Chom Sa-at | ชมสะอาด | 9 | 4,179 |
