= Don Chan district =

District of Thailand

Don Chan ดอนจาน
- District
- District location in Kalasin province
- Coordinates: 16°27′30″N 103°41′42″E
- Country: Thailand
- Province: Kalasin
- Seat: Don Chan

Area
  - Total: 236.6 km^{2} (91.4 sq mi)

Population (2005)
  - Total: 25,164
  - Density: 106.4/km^{2} (276/sq mi)
- Time zone: UTC+7 (ICT)
- Postal code: 46000
- Geocode: 4617

Don Chan (Thai: ดอนจาน, pronounced [dɔ̄ːn tɕāːn]; Northeastern Thai: ดอนจาน, pronounced [dɔ̀ːn tɕàːn]) is a district (amphoe) of Kalasin province, northeastern Thailand.

== Geography ==
Neighbouring districts are (from the south clockwise): Kamalasai, Mueang Kalasin, Na Mon, and Kuchinarai of Kalasin Province, and Pho Chai of Roi Et province.

== History ==
The minor district (king amphoe) was created on 15 July 1996, when it was split off from Mueang Kalasin district.

On 15 May 2007, all 81 minor districts were upgraded to full districts. With publication in the Royal Gazette on 24 August, the upgrade became official.

== Administration ==
The district is divided into five sub-districts (tambons), which are further subdivided into 48 villages (mubans). There are no municipal (thesaban) areas, and five tambon administrative organizations (TAO).

No.	Name	Thai name	Villages	Pop.
1.	Don Chan	ดอนจาน	9	7,034
2.	Sa-at Chai Si	สะอาดไชยศรี	8	3,708
3.	Dong Phayung	ดงพยุง	13	5,441
4.	Muang Na	ม่วงนา	9	4,348
5.	Na Champa	นาจำปา	9	4,633
