= Changhan district =

Changhan จังหาร
- District
- District location in Roi Et province
- Coordinates: 16°8′18″N 103°36′54″E
- Country: Thailand
- Province: Roi Et
- Seat: Changhan

Area
  - Total: 165.1 km^{2} (63.7 sq mi)

Population (2005)
  - Total: 47,832
  - Density: 47.4/km^{2} (123/sq mi)
- Time zone: UTC+7 (ICT)
- Postal code: 45000
- Geocode: 4517

Changhan (Thai: จังหาร, pronounced [tɕāŋ.hǎːn]; Northeastern Thai: จังหาร, pronounced [tɕàŋ.hǎːn]) is a district (amphoe) in the northwestern part of Roi Et province, northeastern Thailand.

== Geography ==
Neighboring districts are (from the east clockwise): Chiang Khwan and Mueang Roi Et of Roi Et Province; Mueang Maha Sarakham of Maha Sarakham province; Khong Chai and Kamalasai of Kalasin province.

== History ==
The minor district (king amphoe) Changhan was established on 1 April 1989, when five tambon were split off from Mueang Roi Et district. Tambon Yang Nai was split from tambon Pa Fa in July 1989, and Phakwaen from Muang Lat in July 1990. On 8 September 1995 the minor district was upgraded to a full district.

== Administration ==
The district is divided into eight sub-districts (tambons), which are further subdivided into 110 villages (mubans). There are no municipal (thesaban) areas; there are eight tambon administrative organizations (TAO).

| No. | Name | Thai name | Villages | Pop. |
|---|---|---|---|---|
| 1. | Din Dam | ดินดำ | 17 | 7,560 |
| 2. | Pa Fa | ปาฝา | 12 | 5,462 |
| 3. | Muang Lat | ม่วงลาด | 12 | 5,682 |
| 4. | Changhan | จังหาร | 19 | 7,089 |
| 5. | Dong Sing | ดงสิงห์ | 18 | 9,458 |
| 6. | Yang Yai | ยางใหญ่ | 10 | 4,228 |
| 7. | Phak Waen | ผักแว่น | 13 | 5,036 |
| 8. | Saen Chat | แสนชาติ | 9 | 3,317 |
