= Khong Chai district =

Khong Chai ฆ้องชัย
- District
- District location in Kalasin province
- Coordinates: 16°15′42″N 103°27′30″E
- Country: Thailand
- Province: Kalasin
- Seat: Khong Chai Phatthana

Area
  - Total: 128.3 km^{2} (49.5 sq mi)

Population (2005)
  - Total: 27,098
  - Density: 211.2/km^{2} (547/sq mi)
- Time zone: UTC+7 (ICT)
- Postal code: 46130
- Geocode: 4618

Khong Chai (Thai: ฆ้องชัย, pronounced [kʰɔ́ːŋ tɕʰāj]; Northeastern Thai: ฆ้องชัย, pronounced [kʰɔ̏ːŋ sâj]) is a district (amphoe) in the southern part of Kalasin province, northeastern Thailand.

== Geography ==
Neighboring districts are (from the north clockwise) Yang Talat, Mueang Kalasin, Kamalasai of Kalasin Province, Changhan of Roi Et province, Mueang Maha Sarakham and Kantharawichai of Maha Sarakham province.

== History ==
Mueang Fa Daet Song Yang (Thai: เมืองฟ้าแดดสงยาง) is the site of a prehistoric community surrounded by earthen mounds about five kilometres long. Evidence of its civilization are religious ruins in and around it, and a large concentration of boundary stones called bai sema or sema hin (ใบเสมา, เสมาหิน).

The minor district (king amphoe) was split off from Kamalasai district on 1 July 1997.

On 15 May 2007, all 81 minor districts were upgraded to full districts. With publication in the Royal Gazette on 24 August, the upgrade became official.

== Economy ==
The district is the site of some of Thailand's largest e-waste recycling businesses. Tambon Khok Sa-at in particular has 154 households that purchase old electronic devices, sort them, and extract scrap electronics for materials that can be reused or recycled and sell them to a third party. They process about 1,000 tonnes of scrap per month. An environmental issue is the remaining 24 tonnes of worthless material that must be disposed of. Absent any local disposal facilities, the scrap is trucked to incinerators in Sa Kaeo and Saraburi. Health officials maintain that levels of contaminants are low and do not pose a threat to people's health or the ecosystem.

== Administration ==
The district is divided into five sub-districts (tambons), which are further subdivided into 48 villages (mubans). There are no municipal (thesaban) areas, and five tambon administrative organizations (TAO).

No.	Name	Thai name	Villages	Pop.
1.	Khong Chai Phatthana	ฆ้องชัยพัฒนา	11	6,658
2.	Lao Klang	เหล่ากลาง	8	4,541
3.	Khok Sa-at	โคกสะอาด	12	7,531
4.	Non Sila Loeng	โนนศิลาเลิง	9	4,556
5.	Lam Chi	ลำชี	8	3,812
