= Roi Et =

- Town
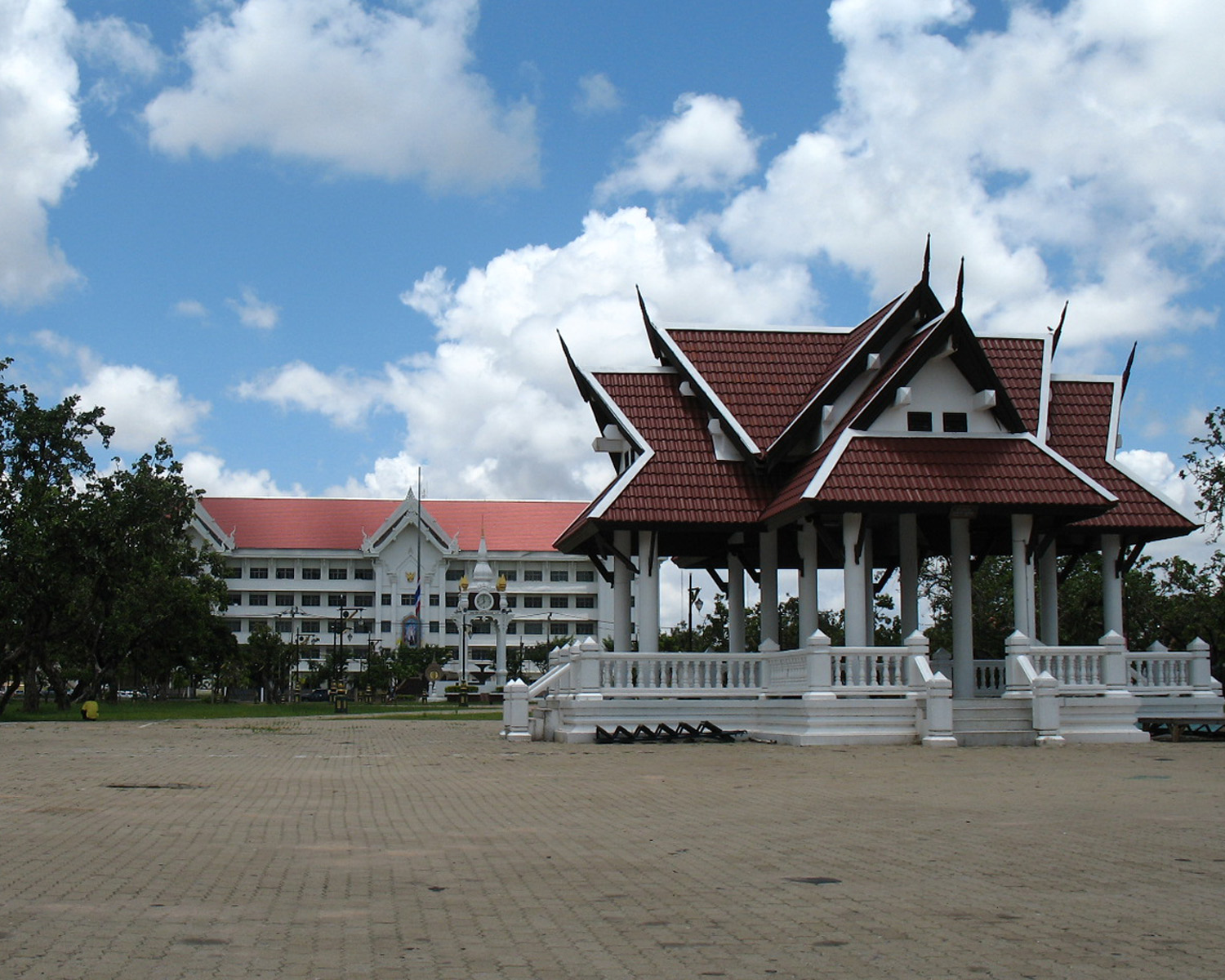
- Roi Et City Hall

- Location within Thailand
- Coordinates: 16°3′11″N 103°39′4″E
- Country: Thailand
- Provinces: Roi Et Province
- Amphoe: Mueang Roi Et District
- Elevation: 150 m (490 ft)

Population (2006)
  - Total: 34,229
- Time zone: UTC+7 (ICT)

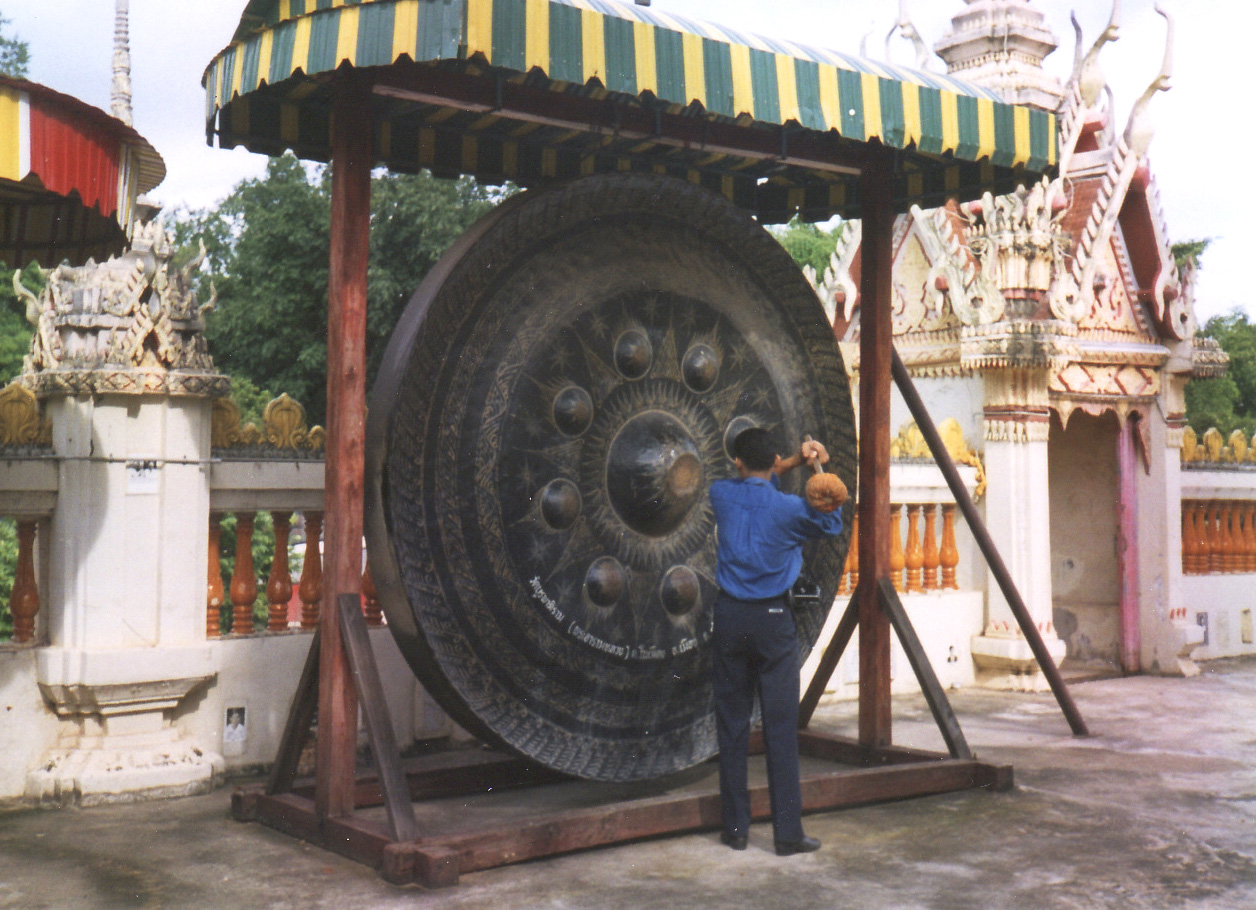
Large gong at a Buddhist temple, Roi Et

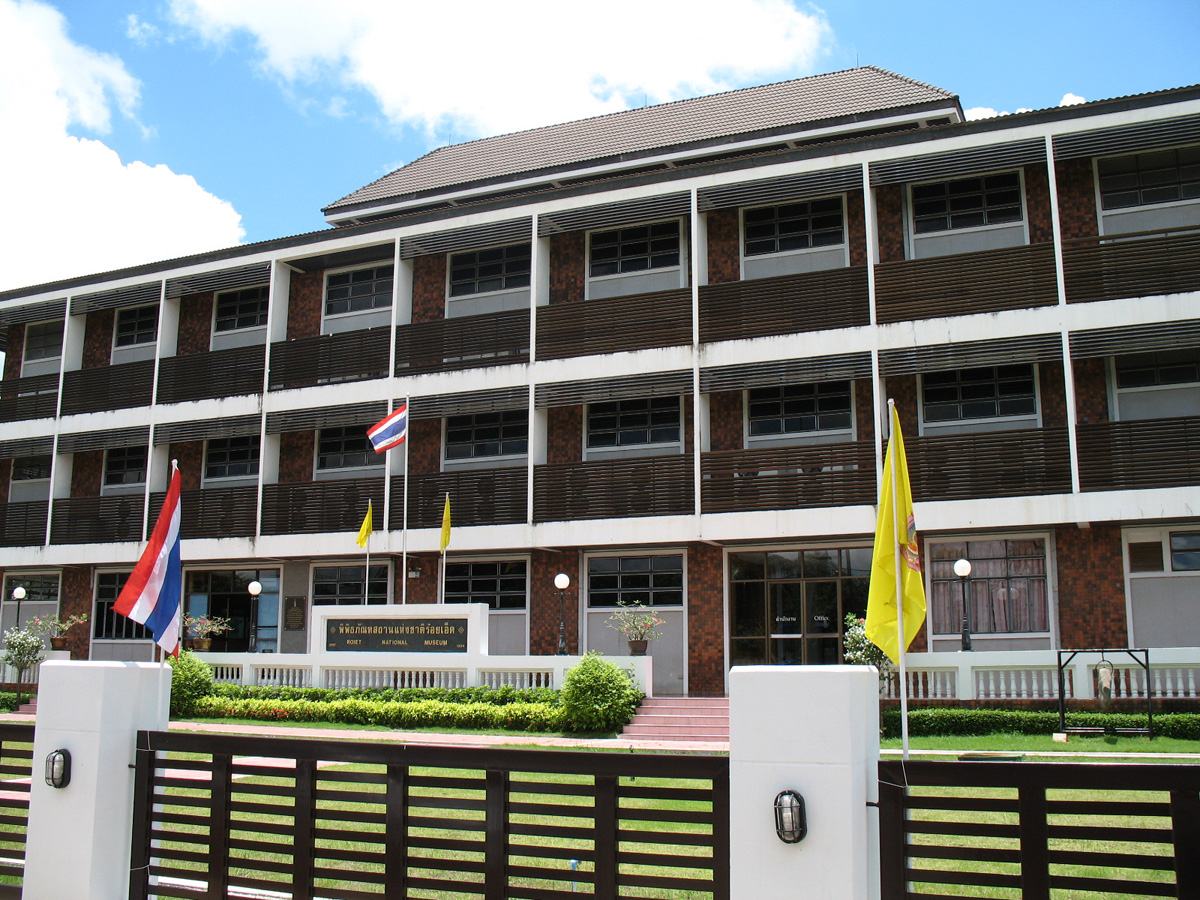
Roi Et National Museum

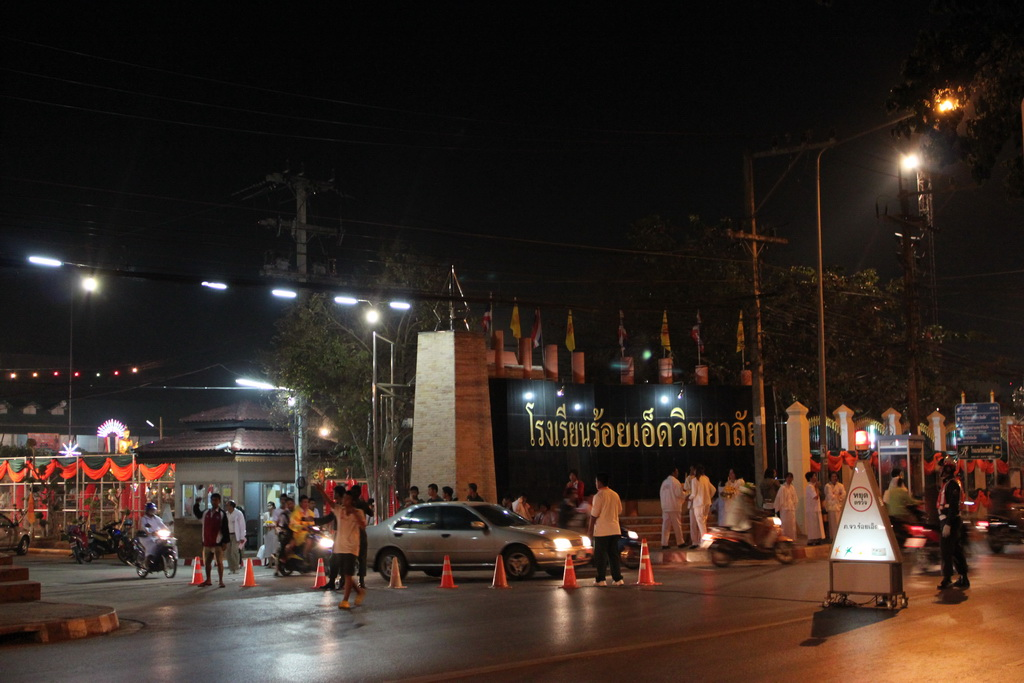
Main road in Roi Et.

Roi Et (Thai: ร้อยเอ็ด, pronounced [rɔ́ːj ʔèt]) is a town (thesaban mueang) in north-eastern Thailand, capital of Roi Et province. It covers the whole tambon Nai Mueang of Mueang Roi Et district. As of 2006 it had a population of 34,229. Roi Et is 514 km from Bangkok, and is served by Roi Et Airport.

== Etymology ==
The place name Roi Et (ร้อยเอ็ด, literally "one hundred and one") is derived from ร้อย (rɔ́ɔi, "hundred") + เอ็ด (èt, "one"), which in the Thai language carries the archaic and figurative meaning of "many," "a good many," "a great many," or "numerous."

== Geography ==
Roi Et lies on a flat plain about 150 metres (490 ft) above sea level.

== History ==
Roi Et has been inhabited since the prehistory, the community was then influenced by Dvaravati around the 5th century and continued to the Angkorian period, but was abandoned following the decline of the Angkor in the 13th century. It was repopulated by Lao people led by Suthonmanee (เจ้าสุทนต์มณี) from Mueang Suwannaphum in 1775.

Roi Et City has been a major settlement for more than 300 years. In ancient times It was once called 'Saket Nakhon' and referred to as "a large city with 11 gates and 11 vassal cities", but in modern-day terms it would be classed as a middle sized market town.

== Main features of the town ==
At the center of Roi Et lies a lake, next to a 101-meter observation tower that is modeled in the shape of a traditional circular panpipe.

== Climate ==
Roi Et has a tropical savanna climate (Köppen climate classification Aw). Winters are dry and very warm. Temperatures rise until April, which is hot with the average daily maximum at 35.7 °C (96.3 °F). The monsoon season runs from May through October, with heavy rain and somewhat cooler temperatures during the day, although nights remain warm.

Climate data for Roi Et (1991–2020, extremes 1953-present)
Month	Jan	Feb	Mar	Apr	May	Jun	Jul	Aug	Sep	Oct	Nov	Dec	Year
Record high °C (°F)	37.3 (99.1)	38.7 (101.7)	41.2 (106.2)	43.3 (109.9)	42.7 (108.9)	37.8 (100.0)	36.8 (98.2)	36.8 (98.2)	35.7 (96.3)	34.9 (94.8)	36.2 (97.2)	35.0 (95.0)	43.3 (109.9)
Mean daily maximum °C (°F)	30.5 (86.9)	32.7 (90.9)	34.9 (94.8)	36.0 (96.8)	34.7 (94.5)	33.7 (92.7)	32.6 (90.7)	32.0 (89.6)	31.6 (88.9)	31.5 (88.7)	31.2 (88.2)	29.9 (85.8)	32.6 (90.7)
Daily mean °C (°F)	23.7 (74.7)	25.8 (78.4)	28.5 (83.3)	29.9 (85.8)	29.4 (84.9)	29.1 (84.4)	28.4 (83.1)	28.0 (82.4)	27.7 (81.9)	27.0 (80.6)	25.5 (77.9)	23.6 (74.5)	27.2 (81.0)
Mean daily minimum °C (°F)	17.8 (64.0)	19.8 (67.6)	23.1 (73.6)	24.9 (76.8)	25.4 (77.7)	25.5 (77.9)	25.3 (77.5)	25.0 (77.0)	24.7 (76.5)	23.2 (73.8)	20.7 (69.3)	18.1 (64.6)	22.8 (73.0)
Record low °C (°F)	6.3 (43.3)	9.8 (49.6)	10.9 (51.6)	17.0 (62.6)	18.1 (64.6)	21.8 (71.2)	21.2 (70.2)	21.9 (71.4)	20.4 (68.7)	16.0 (60.8)	11.4 (52.5)	6.7 (44.1)	6.3 (43.3)
Average precipitation mm (inches)	6.9 (0.27)	11.5 (0.45)	43.0 (1.69)	79.7 (3.14)	180.8 (7.12)	189.7 (7.47)	219.7 (8.65)	262.7 (10.34)	250.9 (9.88)	96.8 (3.81)	14.9 (0.59)	2.5 (0.10)	1,359.1 (53.51)
Average precipitation days (≥ 1.0 mm)	0.8	1.4	3.3	5.1	11.9	11.9	13.4	14.9	14.1	6.2	1.4	0.4	84.8
Average relative humidity (%)	65.1	62.7	61.7	64.4	73.1	75.8	78.1	80.2	82.0	76.5	69.8	66.0	71.3
Mean monthly sunshine hours	257.3	243.0	238.7	204.0	158.1	117.0	120.9	117.8	144.0	179.8	219.0	257.3	2,256.9
Mean daily sunshine hours	8.3	8.6	7.7	6.8	5.1	3.9	3.9	3.8	4.8	5.8	7.3	8.3	6.2
Source 1: World Meteorological Organization, Meteomanz (record)
Source 2: Office of Water Management and Hydrology, Royal Irrigation Department (sun 1981–2010)(extremes)

== Transportation ==
Route 214 leads north to Kalasin and south to Kaset Wisai, Surin, and Prasat. Route 2044 leads east to Phon Thong. Route 23 leads west to Maha Sarakham and Ban Phai, and east to Yasothon and Ubon Ratchathani. Route 215 leads south to Suwannaphum and the border with Surin Province. Route 232 is a 4-lane ring road that enables through-traffic to avoid the city centre.

Roi Et is served by Roi Et Airport to the north of the town.
