= Rong Kham district =

District of Thailand

Rong Kham ร่องคำ
- District
- District location in Kalasin province
- Coordinates: 16°16′0″N 103°44′26″E
- Country: Thailand
- Province: Kalasin
- Seat: Rong Kham

Area
  - Total: 82.137 km^{2} (31.713 sq mi)

Population (2005)
  - Total: 16,444
  - Density: 200.3/km^{2} (519/sq mi)
- Time zone: UTC+7 (ICT)
- Postal code: 46210
- Geocode: 4604

Rong Kham (Thai: ร่องคำ, pronounced [rɔ̂ŋ kʰām]; Northeastern Thai: ฮ่องคำ, pronounced [hōŋ kʰâm]) is a district (amphoe) in the southern part of Kalasin province, northeastern Thailand.

== Geography ==
Neighboring districts are (from the west clockwise): Kamalasai of Kalasin Province; Pho Chai, and Chiang Khwan of Roi Et province.

== History ==
The minor district (king amphoe) was created on 1 February 1973, when tambons Rong Kham and Samakkhi were split off from the district Kamalasai. It was upgraded to a full district on 10 October 1993.

== Administration ==
The district is divided into three sub-districts (tambons), which are further subdivided into 44 villages (mubans). Rong Kham is a township (thesaban tambon) which covers parts of tambon Rong Kham. There are a further two tambon administrative organizations (TAO).

No.	Name	Thai name	Villages	Pop.
1.	Rong Kham	ร่องคำ	13	6,151
2.	Samakkhi	สามัคคี	15	5,478
3.	Lao Oi	เหล่าอ้อย	12	3,905
