= At Samat district =

At Samat อาจสามารถ
- District
- District location in Roi Et province
- Coordinates: 15°50′37″N 103°52′44″E
- Country: Thailand
- Province: Roi Et
- Seat: At Samat

Area
  - Total: 454.4 km^{2} (175.4 sq mi)

Population (2015)
  - Total: 74,333
  - Density: 164.4/km^{2} (426/sq mi)
- Time zone: UTC+7 (ICT)
- Postal code: 45160
- Geocode: 4514

At Samat (Thai: อาจสามารถ, pronounced [ʔàːt sǎː.mâːt]) is a district (amphoe) of Roi Et province, Thailand.

== Neiboring districts ==
The district is in central Roi Et Province. Neighboring districts are (from the north clockwise): Thawat Buri, Thung Khao Luang, Selaphum, Phanom Phrai, Suwannaphum, Mueang Suang, Chaturaphak Phiman (at a single point) and Mueang Roi Et.

== History ==
The district was created in 1897, at first named Sa But (สระบุศย์). In 1913 it was renamed At Samat.

In January 2006 Prime Minister Thaksin Shinawatra chose At Samat as the model district for his poverty eradication program. He visited the district and led a five-day workshop. The event was shown as a reality TV show named Backstage: The Prime Minister.

== Administration ==
=== Central administration ===
The At Samat District is divided into 10 sub-districts (tambons), which are further subdivided into 139 administrative villages (mubans).

No.	Name	Thai	Villages	Pop.
1.	At Samat	อาจสามารถ	17	10,963
2.	Phon Mueang	โพนเมือง	17	9,191
3.	Ban Chaeng	บ้านแจ้ง	9	5,540
4.	Nom	หน่อม	13	6,904
5.	Nong Muen Than	หนองหมื่นถ่าน	17	9,192
6.	Nong Kham	หนองขาม	19	10,318
7.	Hora	โหรา	14	7,682
8.	Nong Bua	หนองบัว	10	4,232
9.	Khilek	ขี้เหล็ก	12	4,717
10.	Ban Du	บ้านดู่	11	5,594

=== Local administration ===
There are two sub-district municipalities (thesaban tambons) in the district:

- At Samat (Thai: เทศบาลตำบลอาจสามารถ) consisting of parts of sub-district At Samat.
- Phon Mueang (Thai: เทศบาลตำบลโพนเมือง) consisting of sub-district Phon Mueang.

There are nine sub-district administrative organizations (SAO) in the district:

- At Samat (Thai: องค์การบริหารส่วนตำบลอาจสามารถ) consisting of parts of sub-district At Samat.
- Ban Chaeng (Thai: องค์การบริหารส่วนตำบลบ้านแจ้ง) consisting of sub-district Ban Chaeng.
- Nom (Thai: องค์การบริหารส่วนตำบลหน่อม) consisting of sub-district Nom.
- Nong Muen Than (Thai: องค์การบริหารส่วนตำบลหนองหมื่นถ่าน) consisting of sub-district Nong Muen Than.
- Nong Kham (Thai: องค์การบริหารส่วนตำบลหนองขาม) consisting of sub-district Nong Kham.
- Hora (Thai: องค์การบริหารส่วนตำบลโหรา) consisting of sub-district Hora.
- Nong Bua (Thai: องค์การบริหารส่วนตำบลหนองบัว) consisting of sub-district Nong Bua.
- Khilek (Thai: องค์การบริหารส่วนตำบลขี้เหล็ก) consisting of sub-district Khilek.
- Ban Du (Thai: องค์การบริหารส่วนตำบลบ้านดู่) consisting of sub-district Ban Du.

== Notable people ==
- Sila Viravong: Historian and Philologist.
