= Kamalasai district =

District of Thailand

Kamalasai กมลาไสย
- District
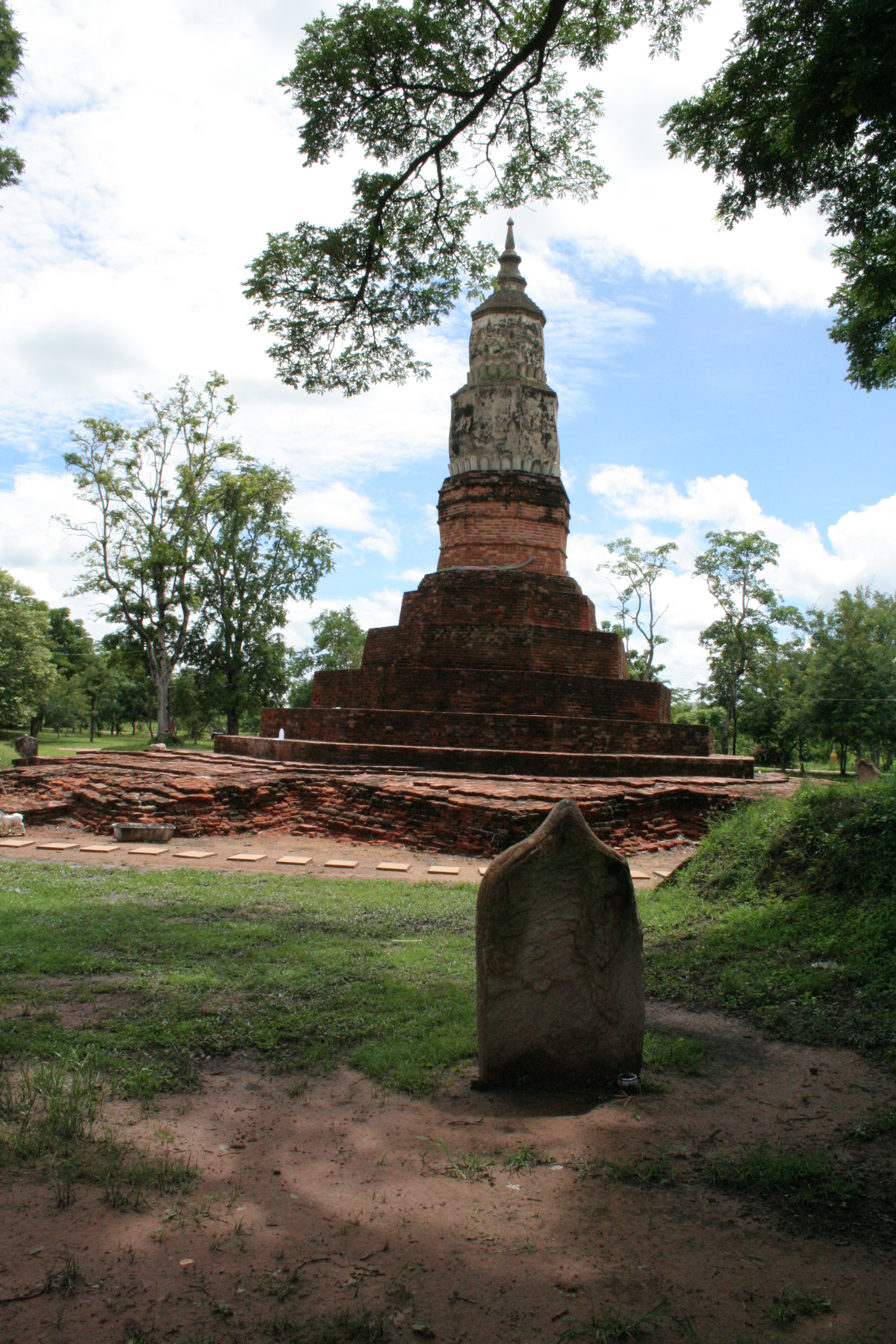
- Mueang Fa Daet Song Yang archaeological site

- District location in Kalasin province
- Coordinates: 16°20′20″N 103°34′31″E
- Country: Thailand
- Province: Kalasin
- Subdistrict: 8
- Muban: 111

Area
  - Total: 325.3 km^{2} (125.6 sq mi)

Population (2015)
  - Total: 69,731
  - Density: 213.8/km^{2} (554/sq mi)
- Time zone: UTC+7 (ICT)
- Postal code: 46130
- Geocode: 4603

Kamalasai (Thai: กมลาไสย, pronounced [kā(m).mā.lāː.sǎj]; Northeastern Thai: กมลาไสย, pronounced [kà(m).mā.lâː.sǎj]) is a district (amphoe) in the southern part of Kalasin province, northeastern Thailand.

== History ==
Kamalasai is the location of the ancient city Mueang Fa Daet Song Yang. At present, only the remains of bricks mixed with soil. Brick collected at Ban Sema in the district is about 28 by 14 by 8 cm, was tempered with rice chaff or rice husk ash, and was made from the sediment of a still lake. There is a two-story moat looks like a waterbody. Dvaravati oval-shaped city plan with a two-story city believed to be caused by urban expansion. There were excavated 130 Bai sema sandstones registered with the Fine Arts Department. In addition, it is also the location of Phra That Yaku, a local biggest chedi in the Dvaravati period during the 7th–11th centuries.

The name Kamalasai means "lotus flower".

== Geography ==
Neighboring districts are (from the west clockwise): Khong Chai, Mueang Kalasin, Don Chan of Kalasin Province, Pho Chai of Roi Et province, Rong Kham of Kalasin Province, and Changhan of Roi Et province.

== Administration ==
=== Central administration ===
Kamalasai is divided into eight sub-districts (tambons), which are further subdivided into 111 administrative villages (mubans).

No.	Name	Thai	Villages	Pop.
1.	Kamalasai	กมลาไสย	18	11,377
2.	Lak Mueang	หลักเมือง	14	9,810
3.	Phon Ngam	โพนงาม	13	7,865
4.	Dong Ling	ดงลิง	17	10,448
5.	Thanya	ธัญญา	15	9,743
8.	Nong Paen	หนองแปน	9	6,876
10.	Chao Tha	เจ้าท่า	16	8,263
11.	Khok Sombun	โคกสมบูรณ์	9	5,349

Missing numbers are tambon which now form Khong Chai District.

=== Local administration ===
There are five sub-district municipalities (thesaban tambons) in the district:

- Kamalasai (Thai: เทศบาลตำบลกมลาไสย) consisting of parts of sub-districts Kamalasai and Lak Mueang.
- Thanya (Thai: เทศบาลตำบลธัญญา) consisting of parts of sub-district Thanya.
- Nong Paen (Thai: เทศบาลตำบลหนองแปน) consisting of the sub-district Nong Paen.
- Lak Mueang (Thai: เทศบาลตำบลหลักเมือง) consisting of parts of sub-district Lak Mueang.
- Dong Ling (Thai: เทศบาลตำบลดงลิง) consisting of sub-district Dong Ling.

There are five sub-district administrative organizations (SAO) in the district:

- Kamalasai (Thai: องค์การบริหารส่วนตำบลกมลาไสย) consisting of parts of sub-district Kamalasai.
- Phon Ngam (Thai: องค์การบริหารส่วนตำบลโพนงาม) consisting of the sub-district Phon Ngam.
- Thanya (Thai: องค์การบริหารส่วนตำบลธัญญา) consisting of parts of sub-district Thanya.
- Chao Tha (Thai: องค์การบริหารส่วนตำบลเจ้าท่า) consisting of the sub-district Chao Tha.
- Khok Sombun (Thai: องค์การบริหารส่วนตำบลโคกสมบูรณ์) consisting of the sub-district Khok Sombun.
