= Pho Chai district =

Pho Chai โพธิ์ชัย
- District
- District location in Roi Et province
- Coordinates: 16°19′25″N 103°46′9″E
- Country: Thailand
- Province: Roi Et
- Seat: Kham Pia

Area
  - Total: 394.3 km^{2} (152.2 sq mi)

Population (2005)
  - Total: 56,917
  - Density: 144.3/km^{2} (374/sq mi)
- Time zone: UTC+7 (ICT)
- Postal code: 45230
- Geocode: 4508

Pho Chai (Thai: โพธิ์ชัย, pronounced [pʰōː tɕʰāj]; Northeastern Thai: โพธิ์ไซย, pronounced [pʰo᷇ː sa᷇j]) is a district (amphoe) in the northern part of Roi Et province, Thailand.

== Geography ==
Neighboring districts are (from the east clockwise): Phon Thong, Selaphum, Chiang Khwan of Roi Et Province; Rong Kham, Don Chan, and Kuchinarai of Kalasin province.

== History ==
The minor district (king amphoe) was created on 1 April 1974, when the four tambons, Chiang Mai, Kham Pia, Sa-at, and Kham Pha-ung, were split off from Phon Thong district. It was upgraded to a full district on 25 March 1979.

== Administration ==
The district is divided into nine sub-districts (tambons), which are further subdivided into 112 villages (mubans). There are two townships (thesaban tambons). Chai Wari covers parts of tambon Kham Pia, and Chiang Mai covers tambon Chiang Mai. There are a further eight tambon administrative organizations (TAO).

No.	Name	Thai name	Villages	Pop.
1.	Kham Pia	ขามเปี้ย	20	10,489
2.	Chiang Mai	เชียงใหม่	12	8,140
3.	Bua Kham	บัวคำ	11	5,268
4.	Akkha Kham	อัคคะคำ	14	7,817
5.	Sa-at	สะอาด	14	4,675
6.	Kham Pha-ung	คำพอุง	13	8,950
7.	Nong Ta Kai	หนองตาไก้	10	3,592
8.	Don Ong	ดอนโอง	10	4,237
9.	Pho Si	โพธิ์ศรี	8	3,749
