= Mueang Roi Et district =

Mueang Roi Et เมืองร้อยเอ็ด
- District
- District location in Roi Et province
- Coordinates: 16°3′12″N 103°39′12″E
- Country: Thailand
- Province: Roi Et

Area
  - Total: 493.6 km^{2} (190.6 sq mi)

Population (26 June 1993)
  - Total: 153,567
  - Density: 311.1/km^{2} (806/sq mi)
- Time zone: UTC+7 (ICT)
- Postal code: 45000
- Geocode: 4501

Mueang Roi Et (Thai: เมืองร้อยเอ็ด, pronounced [mɯ̄aŋ rɔ́ːj ʔèt]; Northeastern Thai: เมืองร้อยเอ็ด, pronounced [mɯ̂aŋ lɔ̏ːj ʔět]) is the capital district (amphoe mueang) in the western part of Roi Et province, northeastern Thailand.

== History ==
Mueang Roi Et is an ancient city. The area around the city was made into a district in 1908. In 1913 its name was changed from Pachin Roi Et to Mueang Roi Et.

== Geography ==
Neighboring districts are (from the north clockwise): Changhan, Chiang Khwan, Thawat Buri, At Samat, Mueang Suang (at a single point), Chaturaphak Phiman and Si Somdet of Roi Et Province; and Mueang Maha Sarakham of Maha Sarakham province.

== Administration ==
The district is divided into 15 sub-districts (tambons), which are further subdivided into 195 villages (mubans). Roi Et is a town (thesaban mueang) which covers the whole of tambon Nai Mueang. There are a further 14 tambon administrative organizations (TAO).

No.	Name	Thai name	Villages	Pop.
1.	Nai Mueang	ในเมือง	-	34,285
2.	Rop Mueang	รอบเมือง	20	15,569
3.	Nuea Mueang	เหนือเมือง	21	19,797
4.	Khon Kaen	ขอนแก่น	14	7,310
5.	Na Pho	นาโพธิ์	10	4,718
6.	Sa-at Sombun	สะอาดสมบูรณ์	16	8,584
8.	Si Kaeo	สีแก้ว	20	12,769
9.	Po Phan	ปอภาร (ปอพาน)	13	7,547
10.	Non Rang	โนนรัง	9	5,603
17.	Nong Kaeo	หนองแก้ว	13	6,860
18.	Nong Waeng	หนองแวง	15	8,137
20.	Dong Lan	ดงลาน	13	7,755
23.	Khaen Yai	แคนใหญ่	11	4,439
24.	Non Tan	โนนตาล	10	4,977
25.	Mueang Thong	เมืองทอง	10	5,217

Missing numbers are tambons which now form the Changhan and Si Somdet Districts.
