= Na Mon district =

Na Mon นามน
- District
- District location in Kalasin province
- Coordinates: 16°34′31″N 103°47′12″E
- Country: Thailand
- Province: Kalasin
- Seat: Na Mon

Area
  - Total: 245.3 km^{2} (94.7 sq mi)

Population (2005)
  - Total: 35,234
  - Density: 132.6/km^{2} (343/sq mi)
- Time zone: UTC+7 (ICT)
- Postal code: 46230
- Geocode: 4602

Na Mon (Thai: นามน, pronounced [nāː mōn]) is a district (amphoe) in the eastern part of Kalasin province, northeastern Thailand.

== Geography ==
Neighboring districts are (from the northeast clockwise): Huai Phueng, Kuchinarai, Don Chan, Mueang Kalasin, and Somdet of Kalasin Province.

== History ==
The minor district (king amphoe) Na Mon was created on 20 September 1973, when the three tambons Na Mon, Yot Kaeng, and Song Plueai were split off from Mueang Kalasin district. It was upgraded to a full district on 1 January 1988.

== Administration ==
The district is divided into five sub-districts (tambons), which are further subdivided into 66 villages (mubans). Na Mon is a township (thesaban tambon) which covers parts of the tambon Na Mon. There are a further five tambon administrative organizations (TAO).

No.	Name	Thai name	Villages	Pop.
1.	Na Mon	นามน	15	9,254
2.	Yot Kaeng	ยอดแกง	18	8,248
3.	Song Plueai	สงเปลือย	16	7,712
4.	Lak Liam	หลักเหลี่ยม	9	5,774
5.	Nong Bua	หนองบัว	8	4,246
