= Selaphum district =

Selaphum เสลภูมิ
- District
- District location in Roi Et province
- Coordinates: 16°2′0″N 103°56′2″E
- Country: Thailand
- Province: Roi Et

Area
  - Total: 792.338 km^{2} (305.923 sq mi)

Population (2005)
  - Total: 122,100
  - Density: 154.1/km^{2} (399/sq mi)
- Time zone: UTC+7 (ICT)
- Postal code: 45120
- Geocode: 4510

Selaphum (Thai: เสลภูมิ, pronounced [sěː.lā.pʰūːm]) is a district (amphoe) in the eastern part of Roi Et province, northeastern Thailand.

== Geography ==
Neighboring districts are (from the south clockwise): Phanom Phrai, At Samat, Thung Khao Luang, Thawat Buri, Chiang Khwan, Pho Chai, Phon Thong, and Nong Phok of Roi Et Province; Kut Chum, Sai Mun and Mueang Yasothon of Yasothon province.

== History ==
The Selaphum District was originally named 'Ban Khao Din Bueng Don' (บ้านเขาดินบึงโดน), which is believed been the name of a village. It was named after an island in the large swamp Bueng Don.

In 1879 Mueang Selaphum Nikhom (เสลภูมินิคม) was created. In 1912 it was renamed Selaphum, and converted into a district in 1914.

== Khwan Mueang (Selaphum) ==
Khwan Mueang (ขวัญเมือง) sub-district is considered the main settlement in the Selaphum District.

The town is considered an old commercial area of the Selaphum district, many of the constructed buildings are commercial in the style of wooden structures, one-story and two-story in height with distinctive styles and specific architectural elements such as doors, balustrades and air vents above the door. Some of these buildings can be dated to the early to mid 20th century.

From the past to the present the town has been a trading community and historically residence of Chinese merchants who were also present at Yasothon.

== Administration ==
The district is divided into 18 sub-districts (tambons), which are further subdivided into 235 villages (mubans). Klang is a township (thesaban tambon) which covers tambon Klang and parts of tambons Na Mueang and Khwan Mueang. There are a further 16 tambon administrative organizations (TAO).

No.	Name	Thai name	Villages	Pop.
1.	Klang	กลาง	11	7,212
2.	Na Ngam	นางาม	16	8,372
3.	Mueang Phrai	เมืองไพร	14	6,498
4.	Na Saeng	นาแซง	14	5,824
5.	Na Mueang	นาเมือง	20	10,332
6.	Wang Luang	วังหลวง	18	6,291
7.	Tha Muang	ท่าม่วง	11	5,039
8.	Khwao	ขวาว	16	9,371
9.	Pho Thong	โพธิ์ทอง	14	7,931
10.	Phu Ngoen	ภูเงิน	18	12,061
11.	Ko Kaeo	เกาะแก้ว	14	7,611
12.	Na Loeng	นาเลิง	10	4,933
13.	Lao Noi	เหล่าน้อย	10	5,741
14.	Si Wilai	ศรีวิลัย	11	4,725
15.	Nong Luang	หนองหลวง	9	3,024
16.	Phon Sawan	พรสวรรค์	9	4,456
17.	Khwan Mueang	ขวัญเมือง	11	6,582
18.	Bueng Kluea	บึงเกลือ	9	6,097
