= Chaturaphak Phiman district =

Chaturaphak Phiman จตุรพักตรพิมาน
- District
- District location in Roi Et province
- Coordinates: 15°50′46″N 103°33′25″E
- Country: Thailand
- Province: Roi Et
- Seat: Hua Chang

Area
  - Total: 522.0 km^{2} (201.5 sq mi)

Population (2005)
  - Total: 81,749
  - Density: 148.9/km^{2} (386/sq mi)
- Time zone: UTC+7 (ICT)
- Postal code: 45180
- Geocode: 4504

Chaturaphak Phiman (Thai: จตุรพักตรพิมาน) is a district (amphoe) in the western part of Roi Et province, Thailand.

== Geography ==
Neighboring districts are (from the north clockwise): Si Somdet, Mueang Roi Et, At Samat (at a single point), Mueang Suang, Kaset Wisai of Roi Et Province and Wapi Pathum of Maha Sarakham province.

== History ==
The district was renamed from Hua Chang to Chaturaphak Phiman in 1939.

== Administration ==
The district is divided into 12 sub-districts (tambons), which are further subdivided into 146 villages (mubans). Chaturaphak Phiman is a township (thesaban tambon) which covers parts of tambon Hua Chang. There are a further 12 tambon administrative organizations (TAO).

No.	Name	Thai name	Villages	Pop.
1.	Hua Chang	หัวช้าง	13	12,642
2.	Nong Phue	หนองผือ	11	7,687
3.	Mueang Hong	เมืองหงส์	17	7,601
4.	Khok Lam	โคกล่าม	16	7,493
5.	Nam Sai	น้ำใส	9	5,140
6.	Dong Daeng	ดงแดง	15	9,029
7.	Dong Klang	ดงกลาง	9	5,982
8.	Pa Sang	ป่าสังข์	14	6,123
9.	I Ngong	อีง่อง	9	4,354
10.	Lin Fa	ลิ้นฟ้า	10	4,581
11.	Du Noi	ดู่น้อย	14	6,712
12.	Si Khot	ศรีโคตร	9	4,405
