= Thung Khao Luang district =

Thung Khao Luang ทุ่งเขาหลวง
- District
- District location in Roi Et province
- Coordinates: 15°59′32″N 103°51′33″E
- Country: Thailand
- Province: Roi Et
- Seat: Thung Khao Luang

Area
  - Total: 138.9 km^{2} (53.6 sq mi)

Population (2005)
  - Total: 24,260
  - Density: 174.7/km^{2} (452/sq mi)
- Time zone: UTC+7 (ICT)
- Postal code: 45170
- Geocode: 4520

Thung Khao Luang (Thai: ทุ่งเขาหลวง, pronounced [tʰûŋ kʰǎw lǔaŋ]; Northeastern Thai: ท่งเขาหลวง, pronounced [tʰōŋ kʰǎw lǔaŋ]) is a district (amphoe) of Roi Et province, Thailand.

== Geography ==
The district is in central Roi Et Province. Neighboring districts are (from the south clockwise): At Samat, Thawat Buri, and Selaphum.

The important water resource is the Chi River.

== History ==
The minor district was created on 1 July 1997, when the four tambons Thung Khao Luang, Thoet Thai, Bueng Ngam, and Maba were split off from Thawat Buri district.

The Thai government on 15 May 2007 upgraded all of 81 minor districts to full districts. With publication in the Royal Gazette on 24 August, the upgrade became official.

== Administration ==
The district is divided into five sub-districts (tambons), which are further subdivided into 50 villages (mubans). There are no municipal (thesaban) areas. There are five tambon administrative organization (TAO).

No.	Name	Thai name	Villages	Pop.
1.	Thung Khao Luang	ทุ่งเขาหลวง	7	4,632
2.	Thoet Thai	เทอดไทย	10	4,753
3.	Bueng Ngam	บึงงาม	13	4,630
4.	Maba	มะบ้า	9	4,859
5.	Lao	เหล่า	11	5,386

== Economy ==
The largely agricultural local economy is augmented by remittances from local women who married foreigners and live abroad. In Ban Jaan (บ้านจาร) village, a settlement of 540 households, at least 100 households have a Western son-in-law, mostly Swiss, leading the town to be known among Thais as the "Swiss village". Local officials claim the number of resident Swiss is overstated as most live with their wives in Switzerland.
