= Somdet district =

Somdet สมเด็จ
- District
- District location in Kalasin province
- Coordinates: 16°42′16″N 103°45′0″E
- Country: Thailand
- Province: Kalasin
- Seat: Somdet

Area
  - Total: 454.1 km^{2} (175.3 sq mi)

Population (2010)
  - Total: 51,125
  - Density: 112.6/km^{2} (292/sq mi)
- Time zone: UTC+7 (ICT)
- Postal code: 46150
- Geocode: 4613

Somdet (Thai: สมเด็จ, pronounced [sǒm.dèt]; Northeastern Thai: สมเด็จ, pronounced [sǒm.dět]) is a district (amphoe) in the northeastern part of Kalasin province, northeastern Thailand.

== Geography ==
Neighboring districts are (from the southeast clockwise): Huai Phueng, Na Mon, Mueang Kalasin, Sahatsakhan, and Kham Muang of Kalasin Province and Phu Phan of Sakon Nakhon province.

== History ==
The minor district (king amphoe) Somdet was created on 16 August 1964, when the three tambons Somdet, Mu Mon, and Saeng Badan were split-off from Sahatsakhan district. It was upgraded to a full district on 25 February 1969.

== Administration ==
The district is divided into eight sub-districts (tambons), which are further subdivided into 91 villages (mubans). Somdet is a township (thesaban tambon) which covers parts of the tambon Somdet. There are a further eight tambon administrative organizations (TAO).

No.	Name	Thai name	Villages	Pop.
1.	Somdet	สมเด็จ	10	13,505
2.	Nong Waeng	หนองแวง	16	9,774
3.	Saeng Badan	แซงบาดาล	15	7,407
4.	Maha Chai	มหาไชย	10	4,551
5.	Mu Mon	หมูม่น	11	7,103
6.	Pha Sawoei	ผาเสวย	11	7,555
7.	Si Somdet	ศรีสมเด็จ	8	5,236
8.	Lam Huai Lua	ลำห้วยหลัว	10	6,249
