= Mueang Kalasin district =

Mueang Kalasin เมืองกาฬสินธุ์
- District
- District location in Kalasin province
- Coordinates: 16°25′57″N 103°30′22″E
- Country: Thailand
- Province: Kalasin

Area
  - Total: 649.9 km^{2} (250.9 sq mi)

Population (2005)
  - Total: 145,579
  - Density: 224/km^{2} (580/sq mi)
- Time zone: UTC+7 (ICT)
- Postal code: 46000
- Geocode: 4601

Mueang Kalasin (Thai: เมืองกาฬสินธุ์, pronounced [mɯ̄aŋ kāː.lā.sǐn]; Northeastern Thai: เมืองกาฬสินธุ์, pronounced [mɯ̂aŋ kàː.lā.sǐn]) is the capital district (amphoe mueang) of Kalasin province, northeastern Thailand.

== Geography ==
Neighboring districts are (from the north clockwise) Sahatsakhan, Somdet, Na Mon, Don Chan, Kamalasai, Khong Chai, Yang Talat, and Nong Kung Si of Kalasin Province.

== History ==
In 1913 the district was renamed from Uthai Kalasin to Mueang Kalasin.

== Administration ==
The district is divided into 17 sub-districts (tambons), which are further subdivided into 180 villages (mubans). The town (thesaban mueang) covers the whole tambon Kalasin. There are three townships (thesaban tambons): Nong So covers tambon Lam Pao and parts of Lamkhlong; Na Chan covers tambon Na Chan and parts of Phai and Phu Po; and Huai Pho covers tambon Huai Pho. There are a further 16 tambon administrative organizations (TAO).

| No. | Name | Thai name | Villages | Pop. |
|---|---|---|---|---|
| 1. | Kalasin | กาฬสินธุ์ | - | 37,929 |
| 2. | Nuea | เหนือ | 12 | 7,584 |
| 3. | Lup | หลุบ | 15 | 10,831 |
| 4. | Phai | ไผ่ | 9 | 5,122 |
| 5. | Lam Pao | ลำปาว | 11 | 5,797 |
| 6. | Lam Phan | ลำพาน | 16 | 8,973 |
| 7. | Chiang Khruea | เชียงเครือ | 10 | 7,123 |
| 8. | Bueng Wichai | บึงวิชัย | 9 | 6,052 |
| 9. | Huai Pho | ห้วยโพธิ์ | 17 | 11,222 |
| 11. | Phu Po | ภูปอ | 9 | 6,457 |
| 13. | Phu Din | ภูดิน | 14 | 5,554 |
| 15. | Nong Kung | หนองกุง | 8 | 4,827 |
| 16. | Klang Muen | กลางหมื่น | 12 | 4,697 |
| 17. | Khamin | ขมิ้น | 11 | 6,405 |
| 19. | Phon Thong | โพนทอง | 8 | 5,658 |
| 20. | Na Chan | นาจารย์ | 9 | 6,010 |
| 21. | Lam Khlong | ลำคลอง | 10 | 5,338 |

Missing numbers are tambons which now form Don Chan District.
