= Roi Et province =

Province of Thailand

Coordinates: 16°3′12″N 103°39′9″E

Roi Et ร้อยเอ็ด
- Province
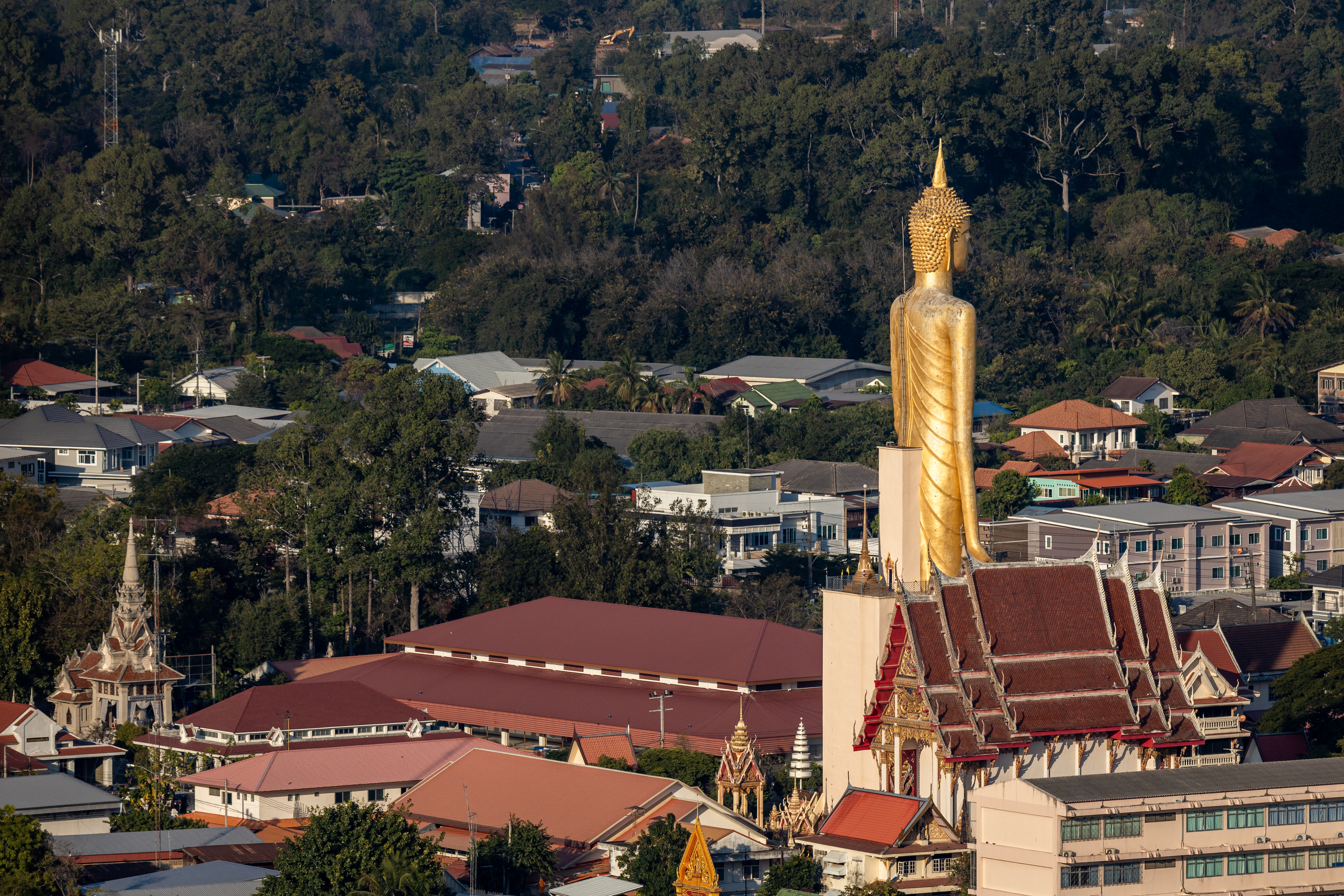
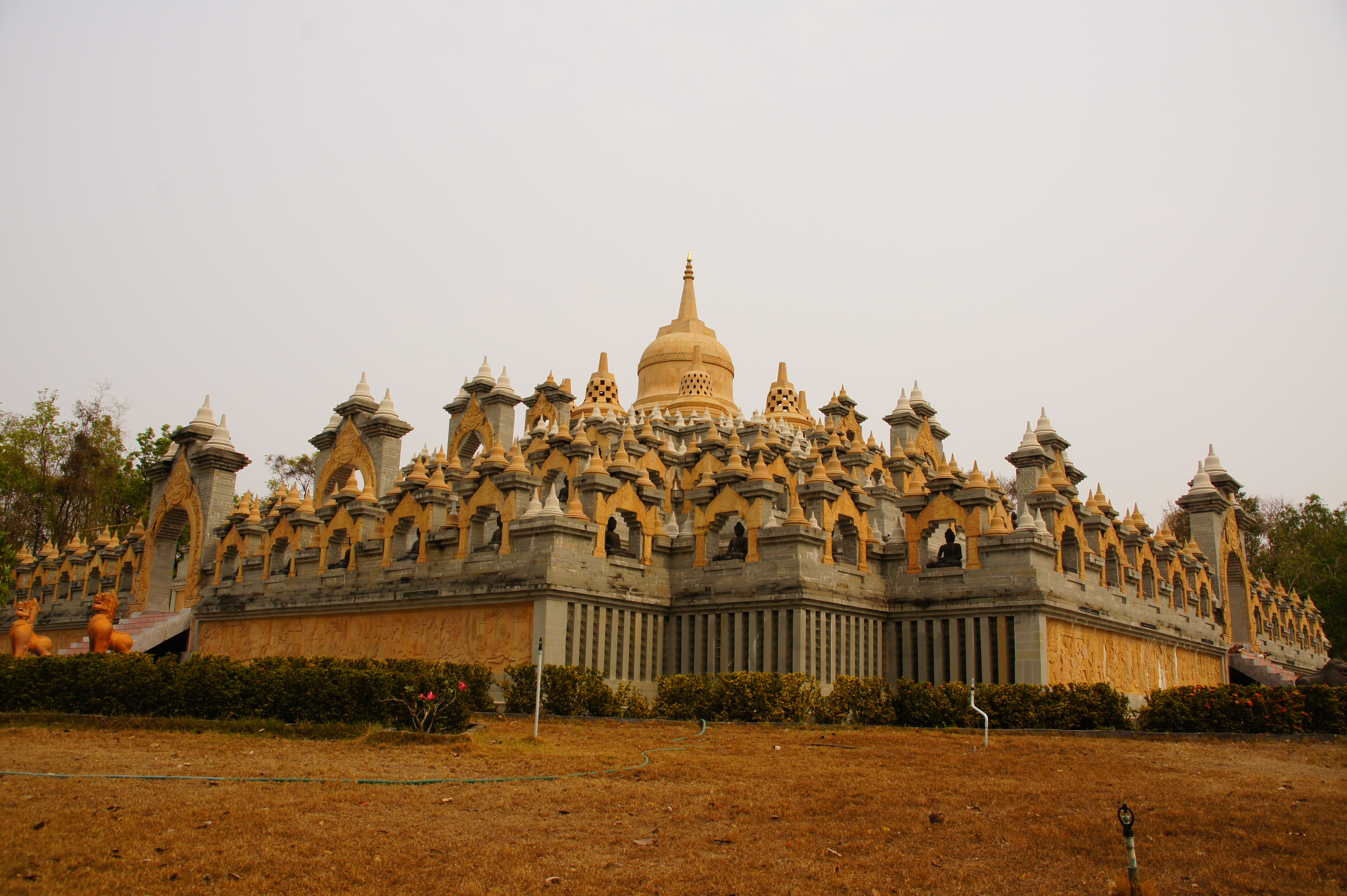
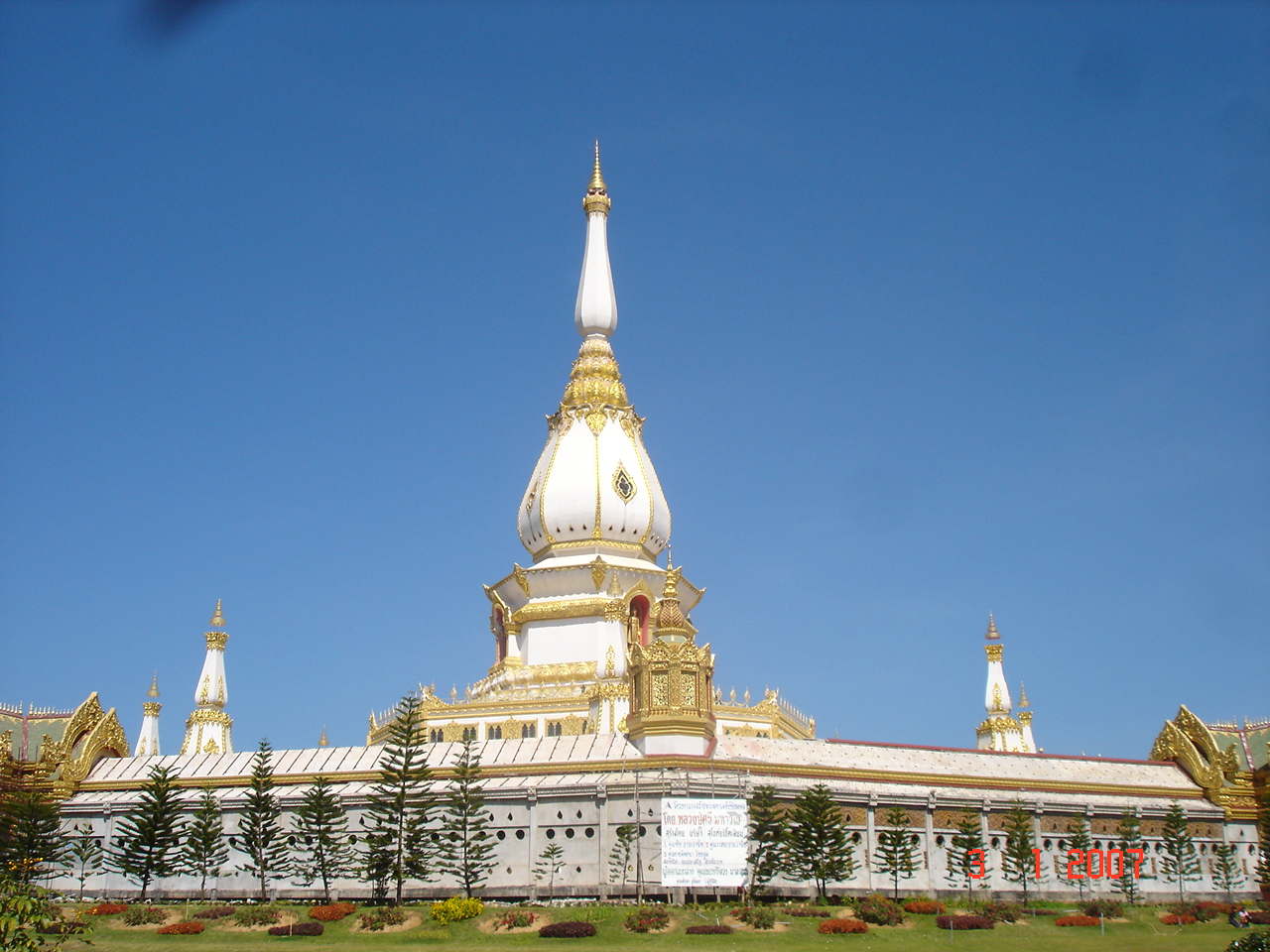
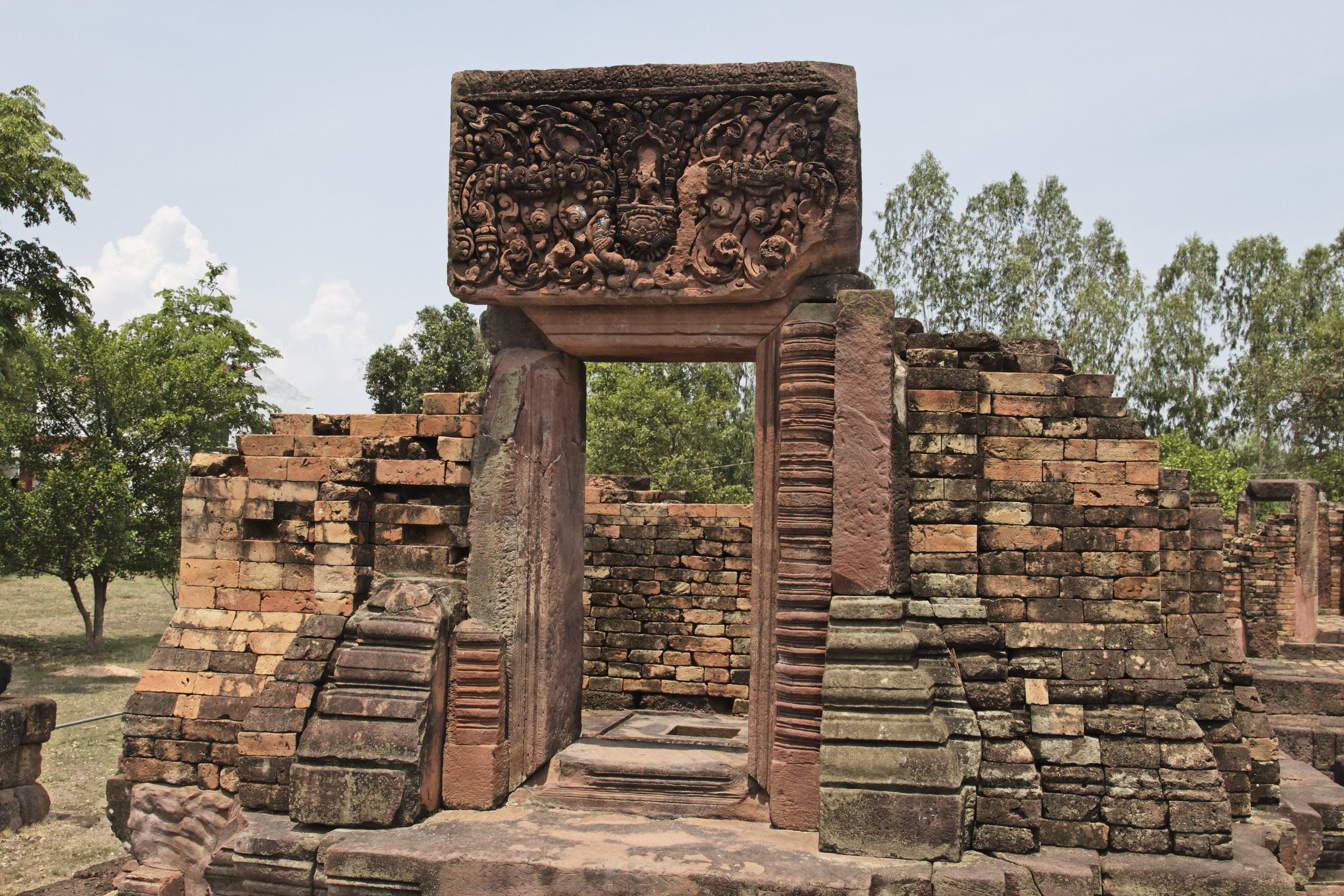
- From left to right, top to bottom: Wat Burapha Phiram, Wat Pa Kung, Bueng Phalan Chai, Phra Maha Chedi Chai Mongkhon, Ku Ka Sing

- Flag Seal
- Motto: สิบเอ็ดประตูเมืองงาม เรืองนามพระสูงใหญ่ ผ้าไหมสาเกต บุญผะเหวดประเพณี มหาเจดีย์ชัยมงคล งามน่ายลบึงพลาญชัย เขตกว้างไกลทุ่งกุลา โลกลือชาข้าวหอมมะลิ ("The beautiful eleven city gates. Renowned tallest Buddha image. Saket silk. The Bun Phawet festival. The great Chedi Chai Mongkhon. Fascinating Bueng Phalan Chai. The wide fields of Thung Kula. Internationally famous white rice.")
- Map of Thailand highlighting Roi Et province
- Country: Thailand
- Capital: Roi Et

Government
  - Governor: Chatchawan Benjasiriwong (since 2024)

Area
  - Total: 7,873 km^{2} (3,040 sq mi)
  - Rank: 25th
- Elevation: 150 m (490 ft)

Population (2024)
  - Total: ▼1,275,519
  - Rank: 16th
  - Density: 162/km^{2} (420/sq mi)
  - Rank: 21st

Human Achievement Index
  - HAI (2022): 0.6654 "high" Ranked 10th

GDP
  - Total: baht 73 billion (US$2.4 billion) (2019)
- Time zone: UTC+7 (ICT)
- Postal code: 45xxx
- Calling code: 043
- ISO 3166 code: TH-45
- Website: roiet.go.th

Roi Et Provincial Administrative Organization องค์การบริหารส่วนจังหวัดร้อยเอ็ด
- Provincial Administrative Organization
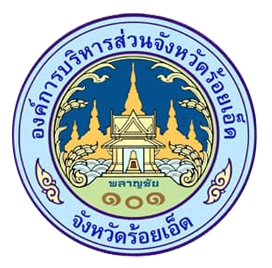
- Seal
- Interactive map of Roi Et Provincial Administrative Organization

Government
  - Type: Local administrative divisions
  - Body: Roi Et Provincial Administrative Organization
  - President: Seksit Wainiyompong
- Website: pao-roiet.go.th

Roi Et (Thai: ร้อยเอ็ด, pronounced [rɔ́ːj ʔèt]; Northeastern Thai: ร้อยเอ็ด, pronounced [lɔ᷆ːj ʔět]) is one of Thailand's seventy-six provinces (changwat) lies in central northeastern Thailand also called Isan. Neighboring provinces are (from north clockwise) Kalasin, Mukdahan, Yasothon, Sisaket, Surin, and Maha Sarakham.

== Toponymy ==
The name of the province literally means 'one hundred and one' (Isan/Thai: ร้อยเอ็ด; RTGS: roi et). Correctly, the number should be "eleven" (Isan/Thai: สิบเอ็ด; RTGS: sip et ), as the province was named after its eleven ancient gates built for its eleven vassal states. In ancient times, the number "eleven" was written "๑๐๑" (101) and the provincial name was written accordingly. Later, people took "๑๐๑" to mean 'one hundred and one' and have since then called it "Roi Et".

== Geography ==
Most of the province is covered by plains about 130–160 meters above sea level, drained by the Chi River. In the north are the hills of the Phu Phan mountain range. The Yang River is the major watercourse. In the south is the Mun River, which also forms the boundary with Surin. At the mouth of the Chi River, where it enters the Mun River, a floodplain provides a good rice farming area. The total forest area is 346 km^{2} (134 sq mi) or 4.4 percent of provincial area.

== History ==
The area was already settled at the time of the Khmer Empire, as several ruins show. An inscription of the sixth or seventh century comes from Don Khum Ngoen, where excavation has uncovered a brick shrine base, a well with four bricks inscribed with the Pallava letters la, ja, pa and ya at its edge, and a gomukha or somasutra. Chaowanee Lekkla places the site 376 km north-west of Sambor Prei Kuk by the Siao, and conjectures from saline soil at the surface that rock salt drew settlement there. However, the main history of the province began when Lao people from Champasak settled near Suwannaphum during the Ayutthaya Kingdom. In the late-18th century, King Taksin moved the city to its present site, then called Saket Nakhon.

== Symbols ==
The provincial seal shows the shrine of the city pillar, which is in the artificial lake Bueng Phalan Chai. The spirit of the shrine, Mahesak, is revered by local people.

The provincial tree is Lagerstroemia macrocarpa. The provincial aquatic life is the spiny eel Macrognathus siamensis. It is an ingredient in making a namya (curry sauce) for eating with khanom chin (rice vermicelli), a local delicacy.

== Transportation ==
=== Road ===
Route 214 leads north to Kalasin and south to Kaset Wiset, Surin, and Prasat. Route 2044 leads east to Phon Thong. Route 23 leads west to Maha Sarakham and Ban Phai, and east to Yasothon and Ubon Ratchathani. Route 215 leads south to Suwannaphum and the border with Surin province.

=== Air ===
Roi Et is served by Roi Et Airport to the north of the town. Thai AirAsia operates daily flights to Don Mueang Airport 470 kilometers away.

== Health ==
Roi Et's main hospital is Roi Et Hospital, a regional hospital operated by the Ministry of Public Health.

== Administrative divisions ==
Map of twenty districts

=== Provincial government ===
The province is divided into 20 districts (amphoes). The districts are further divided into 193 subdistricts (tambons) and 2,311 villages (mubans).

1. Mueang Roi Et
2. Kaset Wisai
3. Pathum Rat
4. Chaturaphak Phiman
5. Thawat Buri
6. Phanom Phrai
7. Phon Thong
8. Pho Chai
9. Nong Phok
10. Selaphum
11. Suwannaphum
12. Mueang Suang
13. Phon Sai
14. At Samat
15. Moei Wadi
16. Si Somdet
17. Changhan
18. Chiang Khwan
19. Nong Hi
20. Thung Khao Luang

=== Local government ===
As of 26 November 2019 there are: one Roi Et Provincial Administration Organisation (ongkan borihan suan changwat) and 73 municipal (thesaban) areas in the province. Roi Et has town (thesaban mueang) status. Further 72 subdistrict municipalities (thesaban tambon). The non-municipal areas are administered by 129 Subdistrict Administrative Organisations - SAO (ongkan borihan suan tambon).

== Human achievement index 2022 ==
Health	Education	Employment	Income
37	30	56	6
Housing	Family	Transport	Participation
8	18	46	60
Province Roi Et, with an HAI 2022 value of 0.6654 is "high", occupies place 10 in the ranking.

Since 2003, United Nations Development Programme (UNDP) in Thailand has tracked progress on human development at sub-national level using the Human Achievement Index (HAI), a composite index covering all the eight key areas of human development. National Economic and Social Development Board (NESDB) has taken over this task since 2017.

Rank	Classification
1 - 13	"high"
14 - 29	"somewhat high"
30 - 45	"average"
46 - 61	"somewhat low"
62 - 77	"low"

Map with provinces and HAI 2022 rankings

== Gallery ==
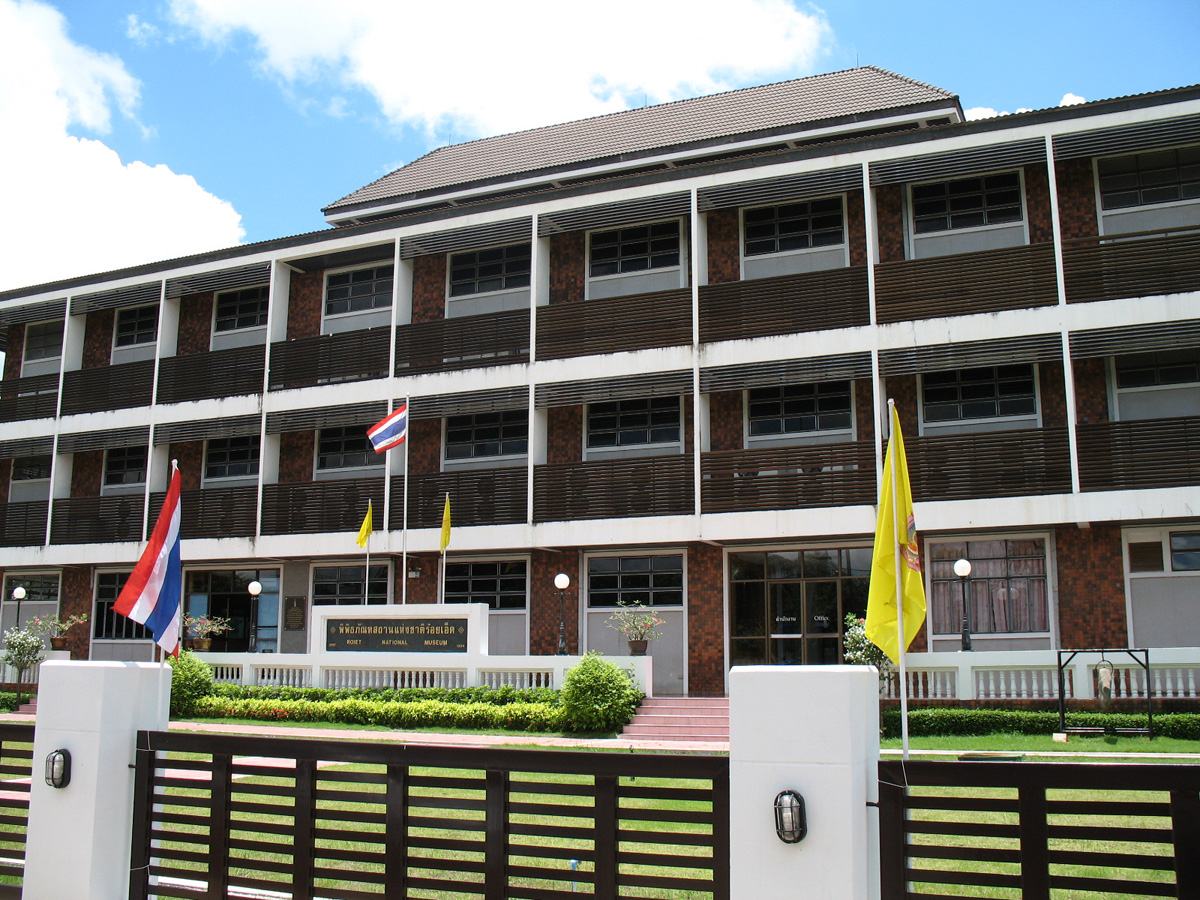
Roi Et National Museum

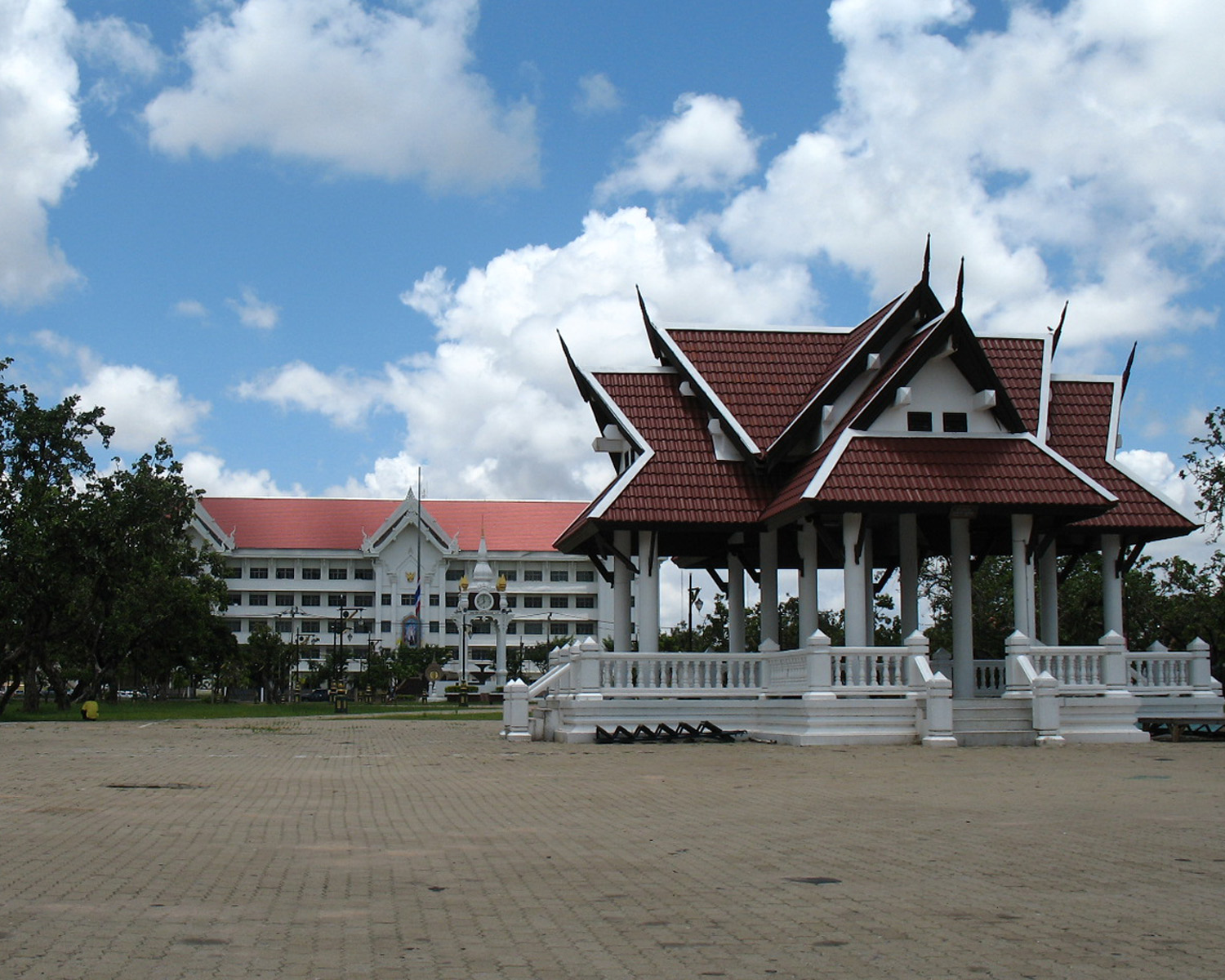
Roi Et City Hall

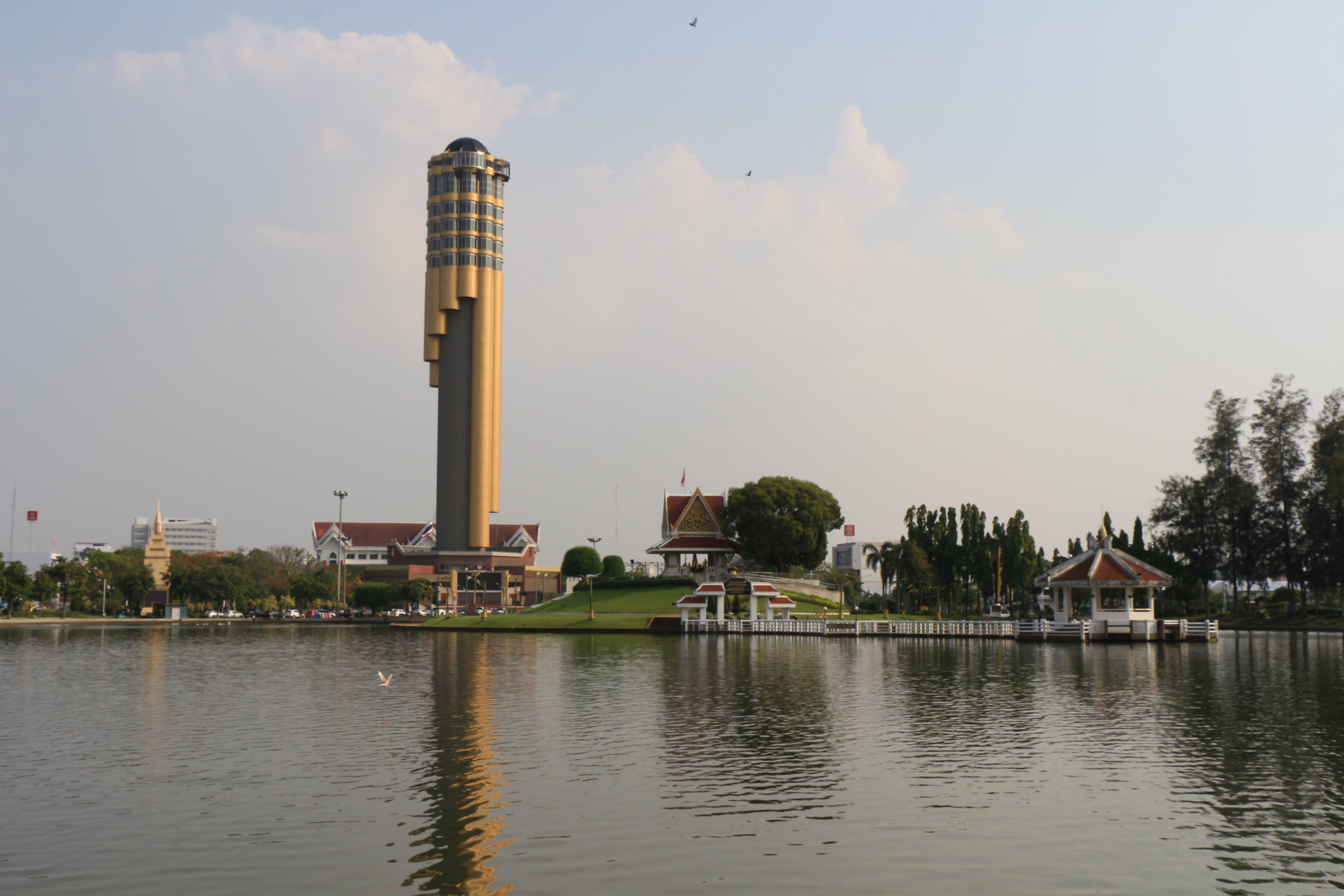
Roi Et Tower
