= Kalasin province =

Province of Thailand

Kalasin กาฬสินธุ์
- Province
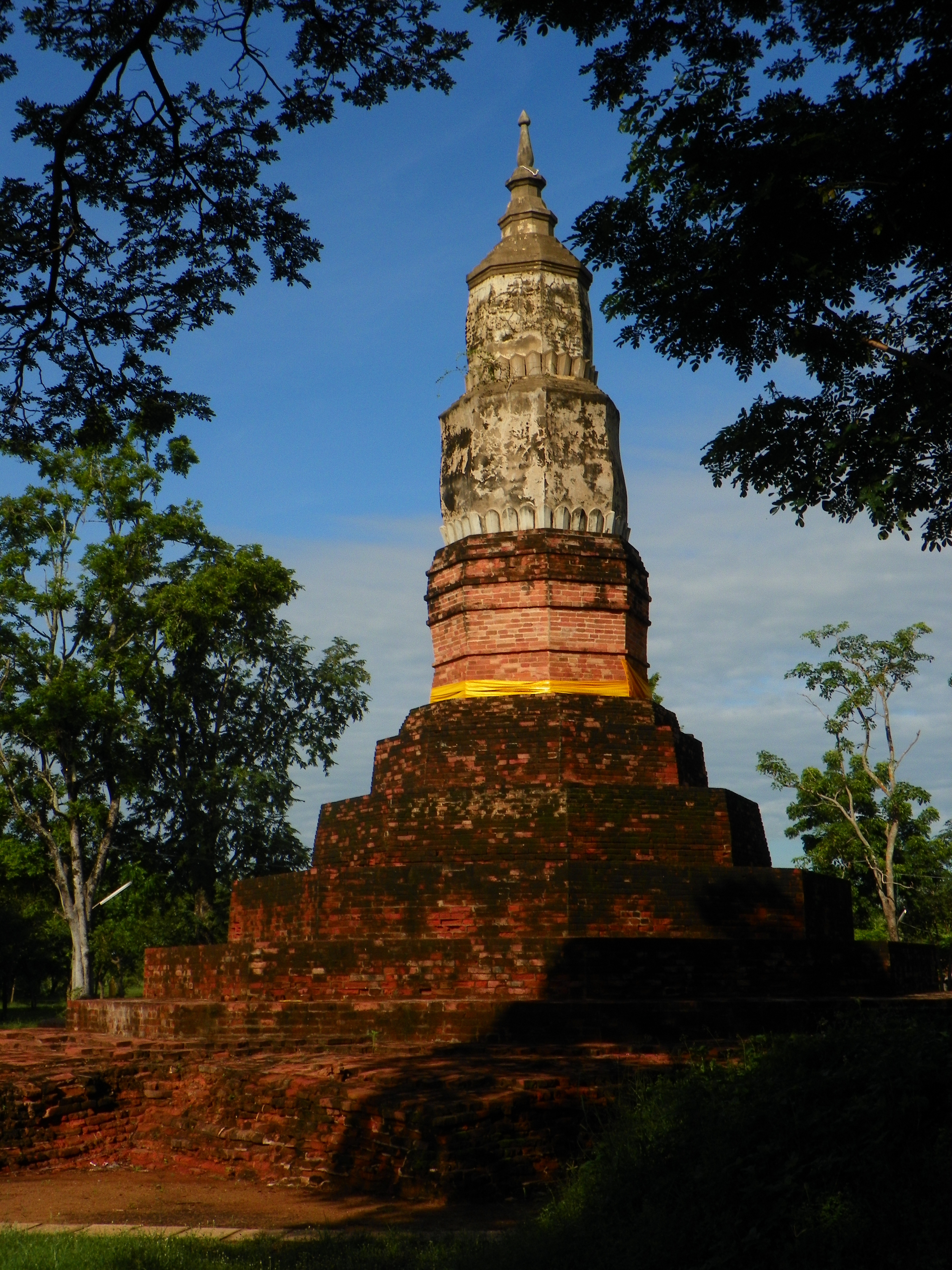
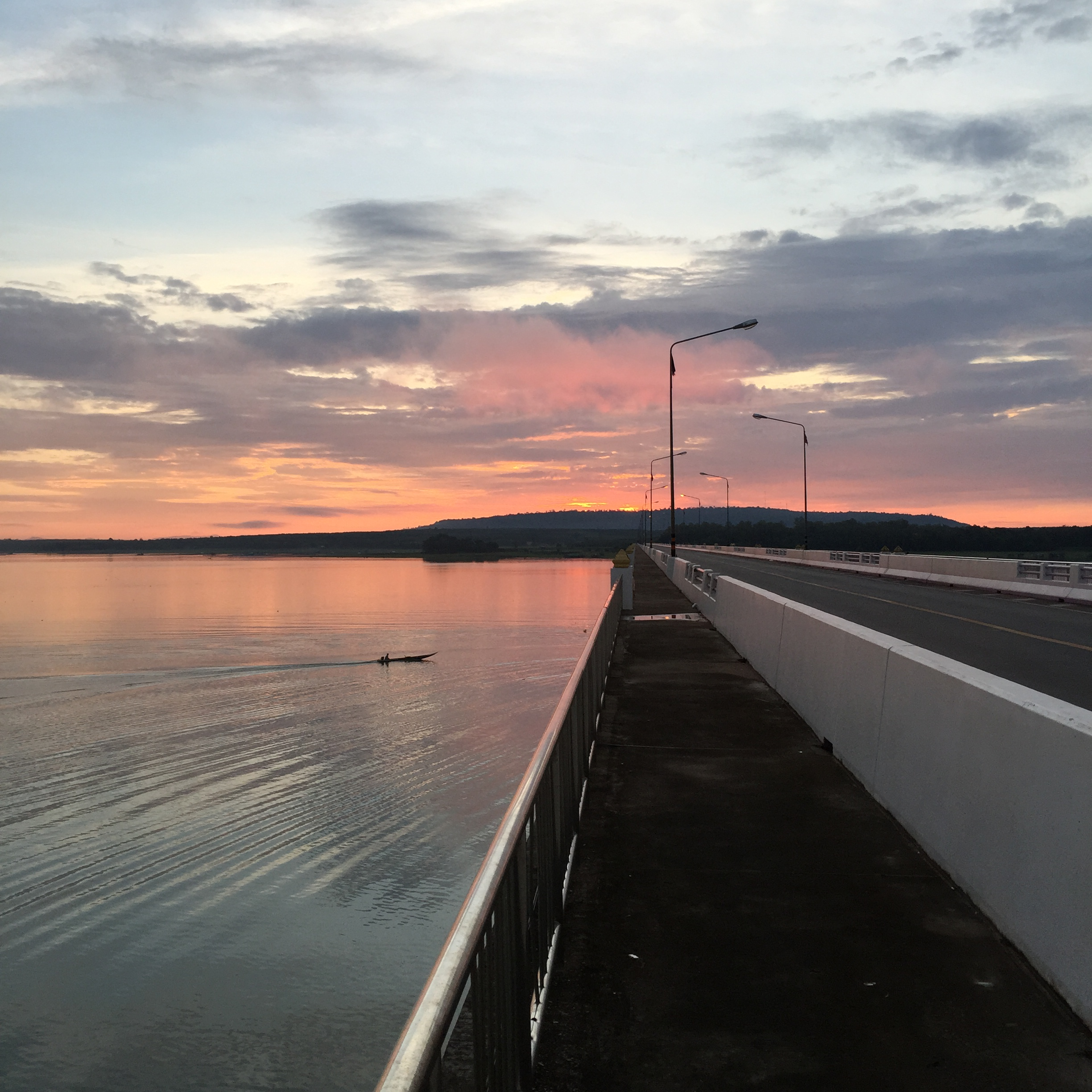
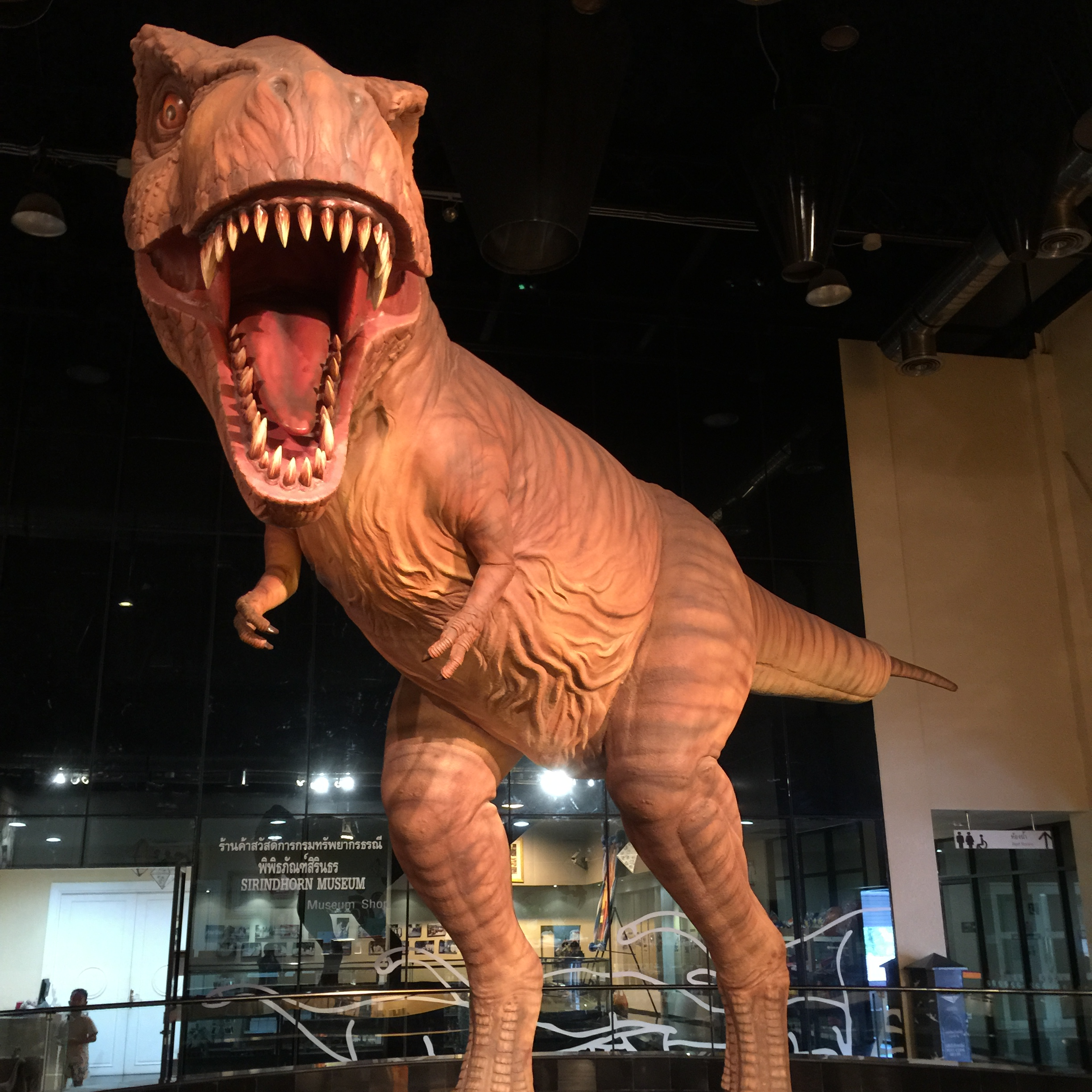
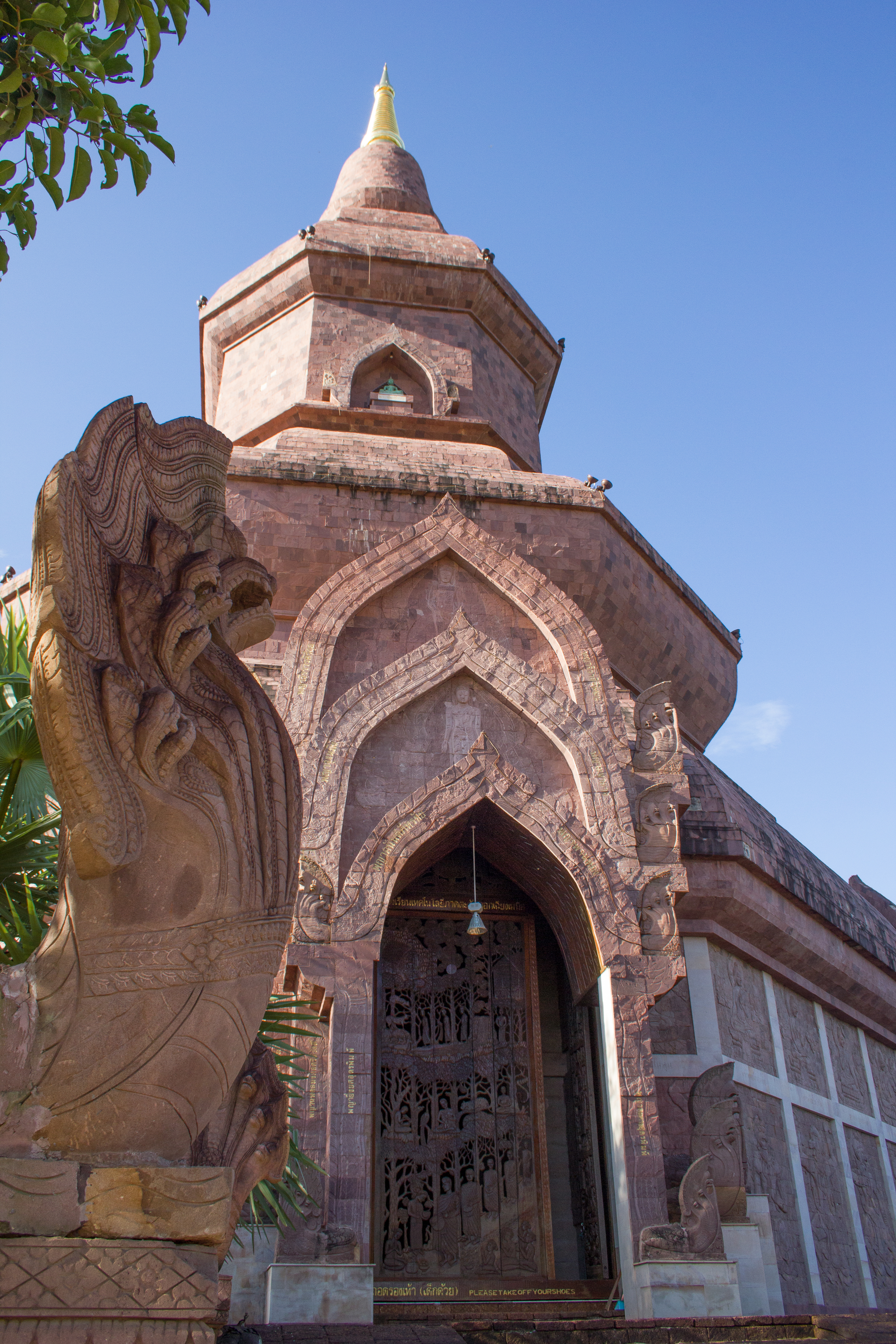
- From left to right, top to bottom: Phra That Yakhu, Lam Pao Dam, Sirindhorn Museum, Wat Buddhanimit

- Flag Seal
- Mottoes: "หลวงพ่อองค์ดำลือเลือง เมืองฟ้าแดดสงยาง โปงลางเลิศล้ำ วัฒนธรรมภูไท ผ้าไหมแพรวา ผาเสวยภูพาน มหาธารลำปาว ไดโนเสาร์สัตว์โลกล้านปี" ("Renowned Luang Pho Ong Dam. Mueang Fa Daet Song Yang, Exceptional Ponglang. Phu Thai culture. Praewa silk, Phu Phan's Savoey cliff. The great Lam Pao reservoir. Dinosaurs, the million-year-old creatures.")
- Map of Thailand highlighting Kalasin province
- Coordinates: 16°25′57″N 103°30′25″E
- Country: Thailand
- Capital: Kalasin town

Government
  - Type: Province and Provincial Administrative Organization
  - Body: Kalasin Province and Kalasin Provincial Administrative Organization
  - Governor: Suwat Khemthanaphet
  - PAO Chief Executive: Chalermkwan Lortrakul

Area
  - Total: 6,936 km^{2} (2,678 sq mi)
  - Rank: 27th

Population (2024)
  - Total: ▼962,444
  - Rank: 22nd
  - Density: 139/km^{2} (360/sq mi)
  - Rank: 30th

Human Achievement Index
  - HAI (2022): 0.6315 "somewhat low" Ranked 51st

GDP
  - Total: baht 56 billion (US$1.9 billion) (2019)
- Time zone: UTC+7 (ICT)
- Postal code: 46xxx
- Calling code: 043
- ISO 3166 code: TH-46
- Vehicle registration: กาฬสินธุ์
- Website: kalasin.go.th kalasin-pao.go.th

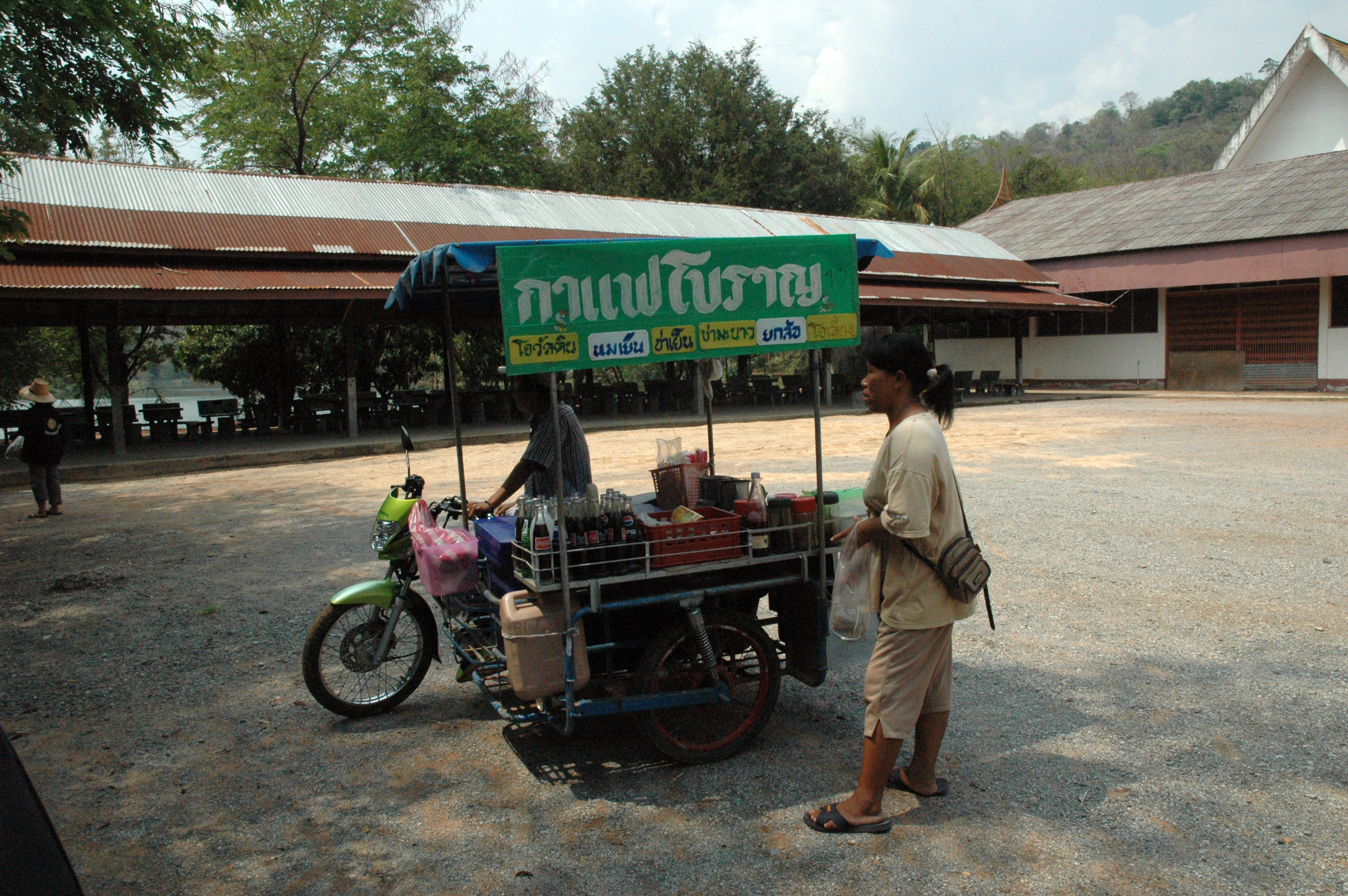
Food vendor motorbike with sidecar in Kalasin

Kalasin (Thai: กาฬสินธุ์, pronounced [kāː.lā.sǐn]; Northeastern Thai: กาฬสินธุ์, pronounced [kàː.lā.sǐn]) is one of Thailand's seventy-six provinces (changwat), located in upper northeastern Thailand, also called Isan. The province was established by the Act Establishing Changwat Kalasin, BE 2490 (1947), and it came into existence on 1 October 1947. Neighboring provinces are (from north clockwise) Sakon Nakhon, Mukdahan, Roi Et, Maha Sarakham, Khon Kaen, and Udon Thani. The province holds Mueang Fa Daet Song Yang, the largest moated site on the Khorat Plateau, and the dinosaur beds at Phu Kum Khao.

== Geography ==
Most of the province is covered by a hilly landscape. The town of Kalasin is at an elevation of 152 m (499 ft). In the north is the Lam Pao Dam built from 1963 to 1968. It stores 1,430 million m^{3} of water for flood prevention and agriculture. The Lam Pao reservoir cuts the northern part of the province in half.

The Thesuda Bridge is a reinforced 2.4 km concrete bridge built in 2006 connecting the district of Sahatsakhan in the east with the district Nong Kung Si in the west, saving up to one hour off the previous journey by road. On the northwestern creek of the reservoir, a road bridge connects the village of Ban Dong Bang in the west with the district town of Wang Sam Mo in the east. Built before 2000, that bridge was still absent from commercially available road maps in 2006.

Kalasin is known for the dinosaur fossils found at Phu Kum Khao (Sahatsakhan District), the largest dinosaur site in Thailand. Most of the fossils are sauropods from 120 million years ago.

The Phu Phan Mountains marks the border with Sakhon Nakhon province, part of which is preserved as a national park. The total forest area is 759 km^{2} (293 sq mi) or 10.9 percent of provincial area.

=== National parks ===
The province's two national parks, with five others, make up region 10 (Udon Thani) of Thailand's protected areas.

- Phu Phan National Park, 665 km^{2} (257 sq mi)
- Phu Pha Lek National Park, 404 km^{2} (156 sq mi)

=== Wildlife sanctuary ===
The province's one wildlife sanctuary, with five others, makes up region 9 (Ubon Ratchathani) of Thailand's protected areas.

- Phu Si Than Wildlife Sanctuary, 303 km^{2} (117 sq mi)

== Economy ==
Kalasin is an agricultural province producing sticky rice and other cash crops such as manioc (cassava) and sugar cane. Rural households also grow fruit and vegetables, and make baskets and silk.

== History ==
During the Cretaceous, dinosaurs such as Phuwiangosaurus, Psittacosaurus and Siamosaurus lived in the area around the province. Phu Faek Forest Park contains the remains of several footprints and were discovered in 1996.

=== Early period ===
Excavation at Mueang Fa Daet Song Yang recovered an inscription in the Old Mon language, assigned to the 8th century CE and to the Dvaravati period. Similar inscriptions from Maha Sarakham and Khon Kaen extend the record of that period in Northeastern Thailand. A stone found near Wat Phra Meo on the Lam Pao mentions Brahmans, an assembly, and a boundary official who erected it to mark a boundary fixed by the assembly. The 7th- to 10th-century inscriptions of the Chi drainage are given as all in Sanskrit. The Lam Pao inscriptions are cut on sema stones and are frequently found with sema alignments and brick foundations read as the remains of Buddhist structures.

Mueang Fa Daet is the largest moated site on the Khorat Plateau and holds the most substantial Buddhist remains in the region. Excavation there in 1991 found occupation running back continuously to about 300 BCE. The reports then give a proto-historic period of about the 2nd to 6th centuries CE, and a historic period of the 7th to 11th associated with Dvaravati culture. In recognising a proto-historic phase at all, the excavators departed from the standard Thai periodisation. A survey of the standing remains gives a different emphasis. The site has more than fourteen religious structures, Buddhist stupa and vihara, scattered within and near a complex of waterways, but only limited evidence of habitation. On that reading it and Mueang Sema are the most impressive of several large centres established in northeast Thailand rather than exceptional.

The site is moated and covers 171 hectares. It stands on the Pao River, a tributary of the Chi, with water access north to the Sakon Nakhon Basin and south along the Chi. Excavations by the Fine Arts Department in 1968 uncovered fourteen monuments, among them the foundations of a Dvaravati ordination hall with sema still standing around it. Three more stood on three separate sides of the That Yakhu stupa near the centre of the site, read either as later reuse or as evidence that sema also marked out stupas. A further excavation in 2000 found sema with a stupa outside the moat. The site lies near the confluence of the Pao and the Chi, in a strategic position to control riverine trade. It was progressively enlarged over centuries, and its rectangular reservoir of 15 hectares has been compared with those at Chansen and Sambor Prei Kuk. A local tradition has Chao Fa Ra-ngum found the moated and walled city in 621 AD. On that tradition he governed as an independent ruler owing fealty to nobody, his power limited to the town and a few defensive outposts.

The brick of the site has been examined in the laboratory. Ancient brick collected at Ban Sema in Kamalasai district has been sampled. The bricks are about 28 by 14 by 8 cm and weigh about a kilogram, and were tempered with rice chaff or rice husk ash, which burnt away to leave voids 3 to 5 mm long. X-ray diffraction gave 68 per cent silica minerals and 15 per cent clays, a mixture read as sediment laid down in a still lake. In compression the bricks yielded at 1.0–1.6 MPa, with an elastic modulus of 100–230 MPa, which matches experimental brick fired at 1,000–1,200 °C. The comparison was made to show general behaviour rather than to fix a strength for the ancient brick.

Material from the site has also been compared with Champa. The carved sema figures and a lion from Fa Daet have been set beside Cham work of the 9th and 10th centuries. The Cham pieces are found the finer, and the Fa Daet lion is taken for local work on a Cham model. The contact is read as cultural rather than political, and the town is held to have had a ruler of its own. The pottery has been read two ways. Excavated wares from Mueang Fa Daet have been connected closely with those of central Thai Dvaravati sites, while the Lam Pao valley excavations suggested no close connection with the Cambodian evidence then known.

One of the Fa Daet sema has been read as a warrior, a figure carrying a sword on his back and standing at a city gate. The stone is called the Ramphan Philap sema (ใบเสมารำพันพิลาป) and is reported in the Khon Kaen National Museum.

Two other uses of the stones are recorded in the province. At Ban Na Ngam sema stand in situ in a circle rather than a rectangle. The site has not been excavated, so whether anything stood inside them is unknown. In the town of Kalasin, Dvaravati stones have been raised as the city pillar (lak mueang), a use unconnected with monastic boundaries.

=== Modern history ===
The first official town was founded in 1793. During the Thesaphiban reforms in the reign of King Rama V at the beginning of the 20th century, the town (mueang) was upgraded to a province. In 1932, when the country experienced the great economic depression, the province was demoted and absorbed as a district by Maha Sarakham province to reduce the financial burden on the country, Kalasin was dependent on Maha Sarakham for 16 years. After the great recession and World War II, it once again became a province in 1947.

In 2023, Kalasin hospital collaborated with Kalasin prison to open a new medical room to treat sick inmates.

== Demographics ==
Languages such as Thai, Isaan and Phu Thai are spoken by people around the province.

== Symbols ==
The seal of the province shows a pond in front of the Phu Phan Mountains which form the boundary of the province. The water in the pond is black, as the name Kalasin means "black water". The big clouds as well as the water symbolize the fertility of the province.

The provincial logo and landmark is the Phra That Yakhu, an octagonal-shaped chedi, made of bricks.

The provincial flower is payorm or sweet shorea (Shorea roxburghii), and the provincial tree is sa-mae-san (Cassia garrettiana). The provincial aquatic life is the edible carp Thynnichthys thynnoides.

The provincial slogan is Fa Daet Song Yang ancient city, Pong Lang folk music, Phu Thai culture, Phrae Wa silk, Pha Saweoi Phu Phan, Lam Pao River, and million-year dinosaurs.

== Administrative divisions ==
Map of eighteen districts

=== Provincial government ===
The province is divided into 18 districts (amphoes). The districts are further divided into 134 subdistricts (tambons) and 1,509 villages (mubans).

1. Mueang Kalasin
2. Na Mon
3. Kamalasai
4. Rong Kham
5. Kuchinarai
6. Khao Wong
7. Yang Talat
8. Huai Mek
9. Sahatsakhan
10. Kham Muang
11. Tha Khantho
12. Nong Kung Si
13. Somdet
14. Huai Phueng
15. Sam Chai
16. Na Khu
17. Don Chan
18. Khong Chai

=== Local government ===
As of 26 November 2019 there are: one Kalasin Provincial Administration Organisation (ongkan borihan suan changwat) and 79 municipal (thesaban) areas in the province. Kalasin and Bua Khao have town (thesaban mueang) status. Further 77 subdistrict municipalities (thesaban tambon). The non-municipal areas are administered by 71 Subdistrict Administrative Organisations - SAO (ongkan borihan suan tambon).

== Human achievement index 2022 ==
Health	Education	Employment	Income
58	47	46	71
Housing	Family	Transport	Participation
6	22	63	34
Province Kalasin, with an HAI 2022 value of 0.6315 is "somewhat low", occupies place 51 in the ranking.

Since 2003, United Nations Development Programme (UNDP) in Thailand has tracked progress on human development at sub-national level with the Human achievement index (HAI), a composite index covering eight key areas. The National Economic and Social Development Board (NESDB) took over this task in 2017.

Rank	Classification
1–13	"High"
14–29	"Somewhat high"
30–45	"Average"
46–61	"Somewhat low"
62–77	"Low"

Map with provinces and HAI 2022 rankings
