= Miss Grand Thailand 2026 =

13th Miss Grand Thailand competition, beauty pageant edition

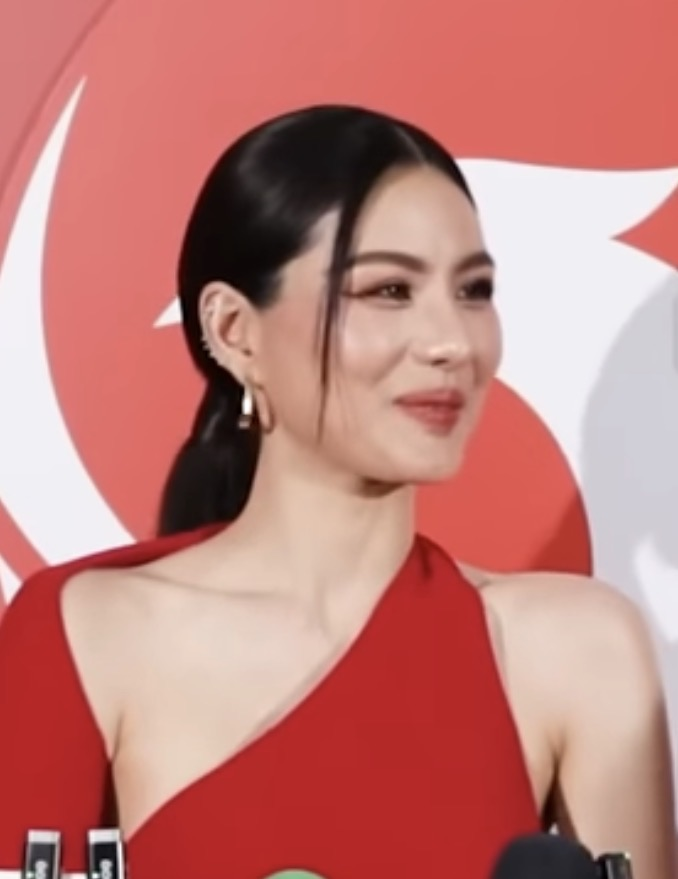
- Patthama Jitsawat
- Date: 28 March 2026
- Presenters: Matthew Deane
- Theme: Golden Grand: The Timeless Song; Grand Evolution: The Thai Soft Power
- Venue: MGI Hall, Bravo BKK Mall, Bangkok
- Broadcaster: YouTube
- Entrants: 77
- Placements: 20
- Winner: Patthama Jitsawat; (Chonburi)
- Best National Costume: Thidarat Srisombat; (Nakhon Phanom)
- Photogenic: Patthama Jitsawat; (Chonburi)
- Best in Swimsuit: Sasiwararin Atsawahirankarn; (Chiang Mai)

Miss Grand Thailand 2026 (Thai: มิสแกรนด์ไทยแลนด์ 2026) was the 13th Miss Grand Thailand pageant, held on 28 March 2026. Seventy-seven representatives qualified to compete in the national finals through local and provincial contests held nationwide.

Saranrat Puagpipat of Phuket crowned Patthama Jitsawat of Chonburi as her successor at the end of the event. Jitsawat will represent Thailand at Miss Grand International 2026 in Thailand.

== Background ==
=== Location and date ===
Miss Grand Thailand 2026 was the 13th Miss Grand Thailand pageant, held on 28 March 2026. It was announced during the grand final competition of Miss Grand Thailand 2025 that Pattaya would be the host city for the ancillary events of the contest.

At the press conference held at MGI Hall on 2 October 2025, the official schedule comprising five subsidiary events was announced. It designating Pattaya as the venue for the Best in Swimsuit competition and the closed-door interview, with the remaining events, the National Costume competition, Golden Grand Timeless Song concert, preliminary round, and grand final, were scheduled to take place in Bangkok on 23, 24, 25, and 28 March.

== Results ==
=== Placements ===
The winner received a crown of honor worth BT฿1,200,000 (US$37,523), a cash prize of BT฿1,500,000 (US$46,904), a condominium unit worth BT฿1,800,000 (US$56,285), and other prizes from sponsors. The first, second, third, and fourth runner-ups all received a cash prize of BT฿800K, BT฿700K, BT฿600K, and BT฿500K, respectively, as well as other prizes from sponsors. The fifth runners-up received a cash prize of BT฿100K, as well as other prizes from sponsors.

Color keys

For regional group:	For international placement:
N Northern group	The contestant won in an international pageant.
NE Northeastern group	The contestant was a runner-up in an international pageant.
C Central group	The contestant was a semi-finalist in an international pageant.
S Southern group	The contestant was unplaced in an international pageant.

Placement	Contestants	International Placements
Winner	C Chonburi – Patthama Jitsawat^{[§]}	5th Runner Up – Miss Grand International 2026
1st Runner-Up	NE Buriram – Panasaya Angelica DeMaagd	
2nd Runner-Up	S Phuket – Ilin Nabsuk	
3rd Runner-Up	C Saraburi – Natthakitta Kerdkanchiroj^{[‡]}^{[π]}	TBA – Miss Tourism International 2026
4th Runner-Up	N Sukhothai – Naruemol Chaloemroek	
5th Runners-Up
5th Runners-Up	C Bangkok – Pitchayawi Yokoyama	Winner – Face of Beauty International 2026
5th Runners-Up	C Chachoengsao – Phatcharamon Thepraksa	1st Runner-Up – Miss Chinese World 2026
5th Runners-Up	S Trang – Warinrat Wanasil	
5th Runners-Up	C Trat – Assuntina Chusak^{[∆]}	Top 11 – Miss Aura International 2026
5th Runners-Up	N Phrae – Jessica Cristina Niinimaa	Top 21 – Miss Eco International 2026
5th Runners-Up	NE Udon Thani – Sirikan Pannamat	
Top 20	N Chiang Mai – Sasiwararin Atsawahirankarn; S Chumphon – Rindares Akresasiriphan; NE Khon Kaen – Ratrapee Thamjalkul; N Lampang – Siriyakorn Teeratongdee; NE Nakhon Ratchasima – Chayapornnuengphet Petcharat; S Ranong – Prapatsorn Tupsit; NE Sakon Nakhon – Kanjana Thilarak; S Songkhla – Benjawan Suchatpong; N Uttaradit – Natthika Chuaythani	

Notes
^∆ Automatically qualified for the top 11 finalists after winning the fast track "Miss Popular vote".
^§ Automatically qualified for the top 11 finalists after winning the fast track "Best Seller".
^‡ Selected by the pageant president as one of the top 11 finalists via the "Boss Choice" fast track.
^π Selected by the pageant president as one of the top 5 finalists via the "Boss Choice" fast track.

== Contestants ==
The following contestants have been confirmed.

Code	Province	Contestant	Age (Note: Ages at the time of the pageant)	Group	Ref
MGT01	Bangkok	Pitchayawi Yokoyama	24	Central	
MGT02	Krabi	Natnalin Romyen	29	Southern	
MGT03	Kanchanaburi	Natnicha Kok-Au		Southern	
MGT04	Kalasin	Darathorn Yoothong	26	Northeastern	
MGT05	Kamphaeng Phet	Pimpakarn Musigo		Northern	
MGT06	Khon Kaen	Ratrapee Thamjalkul		Northeastern	
MGT07	Chanthaburi	Nicharee Chingduang		Central	
MGT08	Chachoengsao	Phatcharamon Thepraksa	18	Central	
MGT09	Chonburi	Patthama Jitsawat	32	Central	
MGT10	Chai Nat	Viirun Vorrachayathanakit		Central	
MGT11	Chaiyaphum	Pornpaya Rianju		Northeastern	
MGT12	Chumphon	Rindares Akresasiriphan		Southern	
MGT13	Chiang Rai	Benjanut Aksornsri		Northern	
MGT14	Chiang Mai	Sasiwararin Atsawahirankarn		Northern	
MGT15	Trang	Warinrat Wanasil		Southern	
MGT16	Trat	Assuntina Chusak		Northeastern	
MGT17	Tak	Warabhorn Wongthong		Northern	
MGT18	Nakhon Nayok	Malinee Klunsorn		Central	
MGT19	Nakhon Pathom	Thapanee Suparattanapirak		Central	
MGT20	Nakhon Phanom	Thidarat Srisombat		Northeastern	
MGT21	Nakhon Ratchasima	Chayapornnuengphet Petcharat		Northeastern	
MGT22	Nakhon Si Thammarat	Thunyathorn Samerchua		Southern	
MGT23	Nakhon Sawan	Tanissara Saelim		Northern	
MGT24	Nonthaburi	Orawan Charutan		Central	
MGT25	Narathiwat	Kwankao Kongsak		Southern	
MGT26	Nan	Jiraporn Changpetpon		Northern	
MGT27	Bueng Kan	Navinda Kongtanasopit		Northeastern	
MGT28	Buriram	Panasaya Angelica DeMaagd		Northeastern	
MGT29	Pathum Thani	Kamolwan Chanago		Central	
MGT30	Prachuap Khiri Khan	Prapassorn Prueksacharoen		Southern	
MGT31	Prachinburi	Kochchakorn Polchu		Central	
MGT32	Pattani	Nannapat Silaruam		Southern	
MGT33	Phra Nakhon Si Ayutthaya	Prinveen Pibulchaiwattanakul		Central	
MGT34	Phayao	Thanyaporn Inala		Northern	
MGT35	Phang Nga	Waridchaya Wongpia		Southern	
MGT36	Phatthalung	Hiranrattana Sattayanont		Southern	
MGT37	Phichit	Waritsara Boonjan		Northern	
MGT38	Phitsanulok	Yanisa Chonlaharn		Northern	
MGT39	Phetchaburi	Artitaya Joeiplian		Southern	
MGT40	Phetchabun	Waritsara Rueangsinsak		Northern	
MGT41	Phrae	Jessica Cristina Niinimaa		Northern	
MGT42	Phuket	Ilin Nabsuk		Southern	
MGT43	Maha Sarakham	Piyapad Sukwongsin		Northeastern	
MGT44	Mukdahan	Napasorn Panpanich		Northeastern	
MGT45	Mae Hong Son	Pirarat Luanglai		Northern	
MGT46	Yala	Panida Tonsawan		Southern	
MGT47	Yasothon	Mali Jasmine Jade Noble		Northeastern	
MGT48	Roi Et	Yupapin Sapsomphong		Northeastern	
MGT49	Ranong	Prapatsorn Tupsit		Southern	
MGT50	Rayong	Suthasinee Wongpayak		Central	
MGT51	Ratchaburi	Phakwan Bamrungpradit		Southern	
MGT52	Lopburi	Ployrung Uonsri		Central	
MGT53	Lampang	Siriyakorn Teeratongdee		Northern	
MGT54	Lamphun	Apisitanan Phungpain		Northern	
MGT55	Loei	Mary Akram		Northeastern	
MGT56	Sisaket	Patsornrangsiman Mahasarnlertpipat		Northeastern	
MGT57	Sakon Nakhon	Kanjana Thilarak		Northeastern	
MGT58	Songkhla	Benjawan Suchatpong		Southern	
MGT59	Satun	Natcha Sanguanchan		Southern	
MGT60	Samut Prakan	Sasiyapat Jiraphatkulchai		Central	
MGT61	Samut Songkhram	Poonnada Borworntanasakul		Central	
MGT62	Samut Sakhon	Pimchanok Siriphon		Central	
MGT63	Sa Kaeo	Patcharita Ruchirangsinan		Central	
MGT64	Saraburi	Natthakitta Kerdkanchiroj		Central	
MGT65	Sing Buri	Picha Woradanitikul		Central	
MGT66	Sukhothai	Naruemol Chaloemroek	22	Northern	
MGT67	Suphan Buri	Chamaipron Chankhao		Central	
MGT68	Surat Thani	Thitijaree Charukanda		Southern	
MGT69	Surin	Comperada Burana		Northeastern	
MGT70	Nong Khai	Nanticha Singhajinda		Northeastern	
MGT71	Nong Bua Lamphu	Thanchanok Noknork		Northeastern	
MGT72	Ang Thong	Pinyapat Khairawi		Central	
MGT73	Udon Thani	Sirikan Pannamat		Northeastern	
MGT74	Uthai Thani	Chadaporn Chaiyasorn		Northern	
MGT75	Uttaradit	Natthika Chuaythani		Northern	
MGT76	Ubon Ratchathani	Waree Sanorwatee		Northeastern	
MGT77	Amnat Charoen	Malinee Suanmee	31	Northeastern	
