= Miss Grand Kalasin =

Provincial pageant in Kalasin, Thailand

Miss Grand Kalasin มิสแกรนด์กาฬสินธุ์
- Formation: May 21, 2016; 9 years ago
- Founder: Keravit Petchjul
- Type: Beauty pageant
- Headquarters: Kalasin
- Location: Thailand
- Official language: Thai
- Director: Thipphayaporn Akkarapon (2025)
- Affiliations: Miss Grand Thailand

Summary result of Kalasin representatives at Miss Grand Thailand
Placement	Number(s)
Winner	0
1st runner-up	0
2nd runner-up	1
3rd runner-up	0
4th runner-up	0
5th runner-up	1
Top 10/11/12	0
Top 20/21	1
Unplaced	6

Miss Grand Kalasin (Thai: มิสแกรนด์กาฬสินธุ์) is a Thai provincial beauty pageant which selects a representative from Kalasin province to the Miss Grand Thailand national competition. It was founded in 2016 by an event organizer Keravit Petchjul (กีรวิชญ์ เพชรจุล).

Kalasin representatives have yet to win the Miss Grand Thailand title. The highest placement they obtained in the contest was the 2nd runner-up, won in 2022 by Thanawan Wigg.

== History ==
In 2016, after Miss Grand Thailand began franchising the provincial competitions to individual organizers, who would name seventy-seven provincial titleholders to compete in the national pageant. The license for Kalasin province was granted to an education personnel Keravit Petchjul, who organized the first Miss Grand Kalasin contest on May 21, 2016, in Mueang Kalasin and named Thirada Saengsuwan the winner. Petchjul relinquished the franchise to Pawornrat Prasertsukho (ปวรรัศมิ์ ประเสริฐสุโข) in 2020.

Sometimes, the pageant was co-organized with other provincial stages; with Miss Grand Mukdahan–Yasothon in 2019, and with Miss Grand Maha Sarakham in 2020, 2022, and 2024.

The pageant was skipped once; in 2021, due to the COVID-19 pandemic in Thailand, the national organizer was unable to organize the national event, and the country representative for the international tournament was appointed instead.

Winner gallery

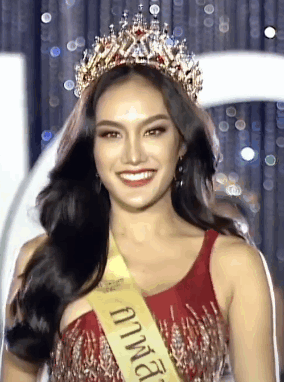
Tanawan Wigg,
Miss Grand Kalasin 2022

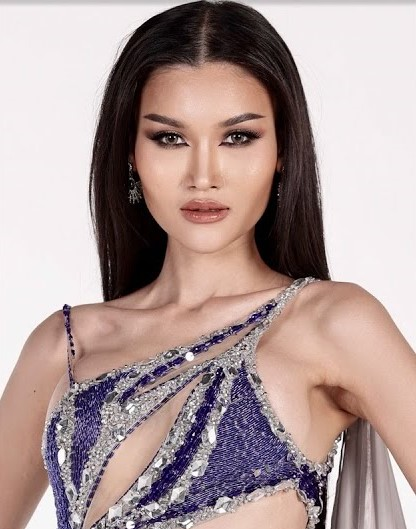
Praifah Tongrae,
Miss Grand Kalasin 2023

== Editions ==
The following table details Miss Grand Kalasin's annual editions since 2016.

Edition	Date	Final venue	Entrants	Winner	Ref.
1st	May 21, 2016	Cha-Long Boutiques Hotel, Mueang Kalasin, Kalasin	14	Thirada Saengsuwan	
2nd	May 6, 2017	Cha-Long Boutiques Hotel, Mueang Kalasin, Kalasin	15	Wanwisa Issarapayap	
3rd	March 29, 2018	80th Anniversary Chalermprakiat Auditorium, Kalasin Provincial Hall, Mueang Kalasin, Kalasin	18	Soithong Saowarattanaphong	
4th (Note: As an inter-provincial pageant with Miss Grand Mukdahan–Yasothon.)	May 29, 2019	80th Anniversary Chalermprakiat Auditorium, Kalasin Provincial Hall, Mueang Kalasin, Kalasin	25	Natthaya Pairin	
5th (Note: As an inter-provincial pageant with Miss Grand Maha Sarakham.)	August 8, 2020	S-Tawan Hotel & Convention, Mueang Maha Sarakham, Maha Sarakham	23	Phattharasuda Konya	
6th	November 28, 2021	Chada View Resort, Mueang Kalasin, Kalasin	22	Thanawan Wigg	
7th	November 27, 2022	80th Anniversary Chalermprakiat Auditorium, Kalasin Provincial Hall	10	Praifah Thong-rae	
8th	October 8, 2023	Taksila Hotel, Mueang Maha Sarakham, Maha Sarakham	12	Alisa Khemnak	
9th	October 24, 2024	Central Chaengwattana, Pak Kret, Nonthaburi	12	Ilin Nabsuk	
10th (Note: As an inter-provincial pageant for Miss Grand Ratchaburi, Miss Grand Nan,, Miss Grand Ang Thong, Miss Grand Kamphaeng Phet, Miss Grand Kalasin, and Miss Grand Nong Khai.)	October 26, 2025	Rattana Bundit University, Bangkok	16	Daratorn Yuthong	

== National competition ==
The following is a list of Kalasin representatives who competed at the Miss Grand Thailand pageant.

Year	Representative		Original provincial title	Placement at Miss Grand Thailand	Provincial director	Ref.
Year	Romanized name	Thai name	Original provincial title	Placement at Miss Grand Thailand	Provincial director	Ref.
2016	Thirada Saengsuwan	ถิรดา แสงสุวรรณ	Miss Grand Kalasin 2016	Unplaced	Keravit Petchjul	
2017	Wanwisa Issarapayap	วันวิสา อิสระพายัพ	Miss Grand Kalasin 2017	Unplaced	Keravit Petchjul	
2018	Soithong Saowarattanaphong	สร้อยทอง เสาวรัตนพงษ์	Miss Grand Kalasin 2018	Unplaced	Keravit Petchjul	
2019	Natthaya Pairin	ณัฐธยาฌ์ ไพรินทร์	Miss Grand Kalasin 2019	Unplaced	Keravit Petchjul	
2020	Phattharasuda Konya	ภัทรสุดา ก้อนยะ	Miss Grand Kalasin 2020	Unplaced	Pawornrat Prasertsukho	
2021	No national pageant due to the COVID-19 pandemic.					
2022	Thanawan Wigg	ธนาวรรณ วิกก์	Miss Grand Kalasin 2021/22	2nd runner-up	Kesinee Meesakunthaworn	
2023	Praifah Thong-rae	ปรายฟ้า ทองแร่	Miss Grand Kalasin 2023	Top 20	Pawornrat Prasertsukho	
2024	Alisa Khemnak	อลิสา เข็มนาค	Miss Grand Kalasin 2024	Unplaced	Pawornrat Prasertsukho	
2025	Ilin Nabsuk	ไอลิน แนบสุข	Miss Grand Kalasin 2025	5th runner-up	Thipphayaporn Akkarapon	
2026	Daratorn Yuthong	ดาราธร หยูทอง	Miss Grand Kalasin 2026		Tain Kanyapak	
