= Miss Grand Amnat Charoen =

Provincial pageant in Amnat Charoen, Thailand

Miss Grand Amnat Charoen มิสแกรนด์อำนาจเจริญ
- Formation: May 24, 2016; 9 years ago
- Founder: Preemart Hemathulin
- Type: Beauty pageant
- Headquarters: Amnat Charoen
- Location: Thailand
- Official language: Thai
- Director: Thipawan Phuwichayasamrit (2024)
- Affiliations: Miss Grand Thailand

Summary result of Amnat Charoen representatives at Miss Grand Thailand
Placement	Number(s)
Winner	0
1st runner-up	0
2nd runner-up	0
3rd runner-up	0
4th runner-up	0
Top 10/11/12	1
Top 20/21	1
Unplaced	6

Miss Grand Amnat Charoen (Thai: มิสแกรนด์อำนาจเจริญ) is a Thai provincial beauty pageant which selects a representative from Amnat Charoen province to the Miss Grand Thailand national competition. It was founded in 2016 by an event organizer company Double B Management, chaired by Preemart Hemathulin (ปรีมาศ เหมะธุลิน).

Amnat Charoen representatives have yet to win the Miss Grand Thailand title. The highest placement they obtained in the contest was in the top 12 finalists, achieved in 2018 by Pimpaka Suwannarat.

== History ==
In 2016, after Miss Grand Thailand began franchising the provincial competitions to individual organizers, who would name seventy-seven provincial titleholders to compete in the national pageant. The license for Amnat Charoen province was granted to an event organizer led by Preemart Hemathulin, who was also the licensee for other 4 Isan contests, including Yasothon, Surin, Nakhon Phanom, and Maha Sarakham. The first Miss Grand Amnat Charoen was co-organized with the four mentioned contests on May 24, 2016, in Mueang Maha Sarakham, where an entrepreneur Ladawan Chaisaeng was named Miss Grand Amnat Charoen.

The pageant was commonly co-organized with other provincial stages. It was a stand-alone pageant only in 2017, 2021, and 2024.

The pageant was skipped in 2022; due to the COVID-19 pandemic in Thailand, the national organizer was unable to organize the national event in 2021, the 2021 Miss Grand Amnat Charoen winner was sent to compete in the 2022 national stage instead.

Winner gallery

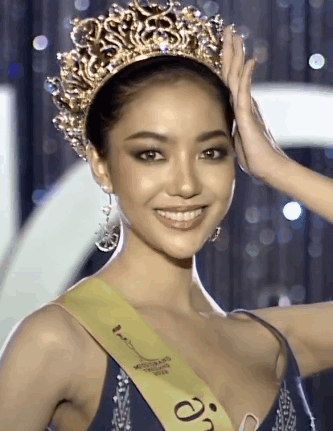
Kamonwan Somsa-ard,
Miss Grand Amnat Charoen 2022

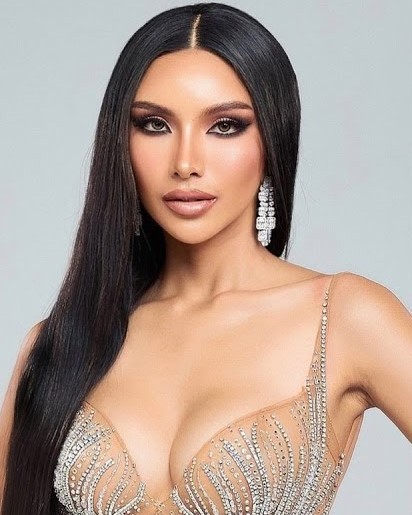
Juthamas Mekseree,
Miss Grand Amnat Charoen 2023

== Editions ==
The following table details Miss Grand Amnat Charoen's annual editions since 2016.

Edition	Date	Final venue	Entrants	Winner	Ref.
1st (Note: As an inter-provincial pageant with Miss Grand Maha Sarakham–Surin–Nakhon Phanom–Yasothon.)	May 24, 2016	Marin Convention Hall, Mueang Maha Sarakham, Maha Sarakham	18	Ladawan Chaisaeng	
2nd	March 22, 2017	Faikid Hotel, Mueang Amnat Charoen, Amnat Charoen	8	Chonthicha Pimpasut	
3rd (Note: As an inter-provincial pageant with Miss Grand Udon Thani–Yasothon.)	May 26, 2018	Boonthavorn Shopping Center, Mueang Udon Thani, Udon Thani	17	Pimpaka Suwannarat	
4th (Note: As an inter-provincial pageant with Miss Grand Roi Et.)	May 24, 2019	Petcharat Garden Hotel, Mueang Roi Et, Roi Et	16	Parichat Buahem	
5th (Note: As an inter-provincial pageant with Miss Grand Buriram–Surin–Yasothon.)	August 9, 2020	Multipurpose Dome, Buriram Municipality, Buriram	20	Thawalak Thabngam	
6th	June 30, 2021	Mahidol University, Amnat Charoen Campus, Mueang Amnat Charoen	13	Kamonwan Somsa-ard	
7th (Note: As an inter-provincial pageant with Miss Grand Nong Bua Lamphu.)	September 21, 2022	The Mall Lifestore Ngamwongwan, Mueang Nonthaburi, Nonthaburi	11	Juthamas Mekseree	
8th	October 1, 2023	Benedict Studio, Bang Kapi, Bangkok	13	Apichar Yarangsisakun	
9th (Note: As an inter-provincial pageant for Miss Amnat Charoen and Miss Grand Samut Songkhram.)	December 11, 2024	Khlong Maduea Subdistrict Assembly Hall, Krathum Baen, Samut Sakhon	13	Nattaniya Suppakingul	

== National competition ==
The following is a list of Amnat Charoen representatives who competed at the Miss Grand Thailand pageant.

Year	Representative		Original provincial title	Placement at Miss Grand Thailand	Provincial director	Ref.
Year	Romanized name	Thai name	Original provincial title	Placement at Miss Grand Thailand	Provincial director	Ref.
2016	Ladawan Chaisaeng	ลดาวัลย์ ชัยแสง	Miss Grand Amnat Charoen 2016	Unplaced	Preemart Hemathulin	
2017	Chonthicha Pimpasut	ชลธิชา พิมพสุทธิ์	Miss Grand Amnat Charoen 2017	Unplaced	Preemart Hemathulin	
2018	Pimpaka Suwannarat	พิมพ์ผกา สุวรรณรัตน์	Miss Grand Amnat Charoen 2018	Top 12	Yuranan Chantaya	
2019	Parichat Buahem	ปาริชาติ บัวเหม	Miss Grand Amnat Charoen 2019	Top 20	Yuranan Chantaya	
2020	Thawalak Thabngam	ธวัลลักษณ์ ทับงาม	Miss Grand Amnat Charoen 2020	Unplaced	Sakparin Kasemthanapat	
2021	No national pageant due to the COVID-19 pandemic.					
2022	Kamonwan Somsa-ard	กมลวรรณ สมสะอาด	Miss Grand Amnat Charoen 2021/22	Unplaced	Piriya Seannok	
2023	Juthamas Mekseree	จุฑามาศ เมฆเสรี	Miss Grand Amnat Charoen 2023	Unplaced	Piriya Seannok	
2024	Apichar Yarangsisakun	อภิชา ยารังษีสกุล	Miss Grand Amnat Charoen 2024	Unplaced	Thipawan Phuwichayasamrit	
2025	Nattaniya Suppakingul	ณัฐฎ์ฐณิญา ทรัพย์ภคินกุล	Miss Grand Amnat Charoen 2025	Unplaced	Thanawat Im-amphai	
