= Miss Grand Roi Et =

Provincial pageant in Roi Et, Thailand

Miss Grand ฺRoi Et มิสแกรนด์ร้อยเอ็ด
- Formation: April 29, 2016; 9 years ago
- Founder: Chinchot Thapabut
- Type: Beauty pageant
- Headquarters: Roi Et
- Location: Thailand
- Official language: Thai
- Director: Kasetsuk Sukhongthong (2025)
- Affiliations: Miss Grand Thailand

Summary result of Roi Et representatives at Miss Grand Thailand
Placement	Number(s)
Winner	0
1st runner-up	0
2nd runner-up	0
3rd runner-up	0
4th runner-up	0
Top 10/11/12	0
Top 20/21	1
Unplaced	7

Miss Grand Roi Et (Thai: มิสแกรนด์ร้อยเอ็ด) is a Thai provincial beauty pageant which selects a representative from Roi Et province to the Miss Grand Thailand national competition. It was founded in 2016 by a local organizer Chinchot Thapabut (ชินโชติ ถาปะบุตร).

Roi Et representatives have yet to win the Miss Grand Thailand title. The highest and only placement they obtained in the contest was in the top 20 finalists, achieved in 2019 by Kobkaew Sriratda.

== History ==
In 2016, after Miss Grand Thailand began franchising the provincial competitions to individual organizers, who would name seventy-seven provincial titleholders to compete in the national pageant. The license for Roi Et province was granted to an event organizer Chinchot Thapabut, who organized the first Miss Grand Roi Et pageant on April 29, 2016, in Mueang Roi Et and named a Technical college student Suwanna Pala the winner. Thapabut relinquished the franchised to Preemart Hemathulin (ปรีมาศ เหมะธุลิน) the following year.

Occationally, the pageant was co-organized with other provincial stages; with Miss Grand Yasothon–Maha Sarakham in 2017, and with Miss Grand Amnat Charoen in 2019.

The pageant was skipped once; in 2021, due to the COVID-19 pandemic in Thailand, the national organizer was unable to organize the national event, and the country representative for the international tournament was appointed instead.

Winner gallery

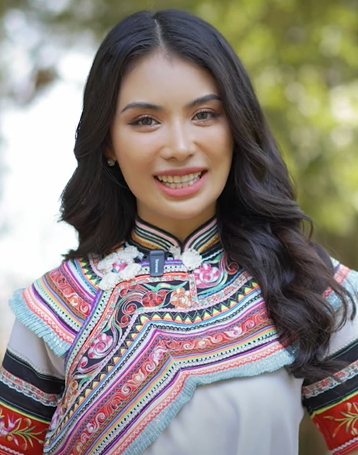
Atita Payak,
Miss Grand Roi Et 2020

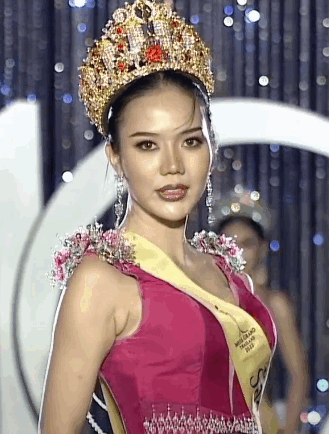
Jaruwan Mompranao,
Miss Grand Roi Et 2022

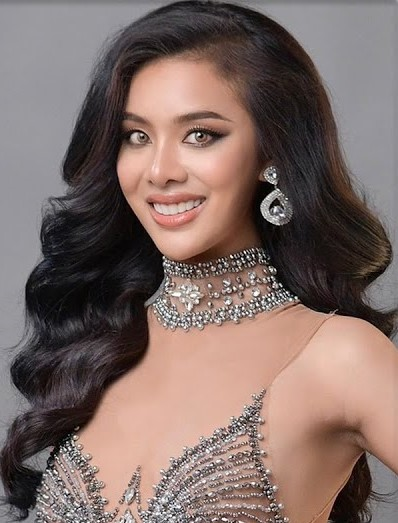
Kanyagorn Naratorn,
Miss Grand Roi Et 2023

== Editions ==
The following table details Miss Grand Roi Et's annual editions since 2016.

Edition	Date	Final venue	Entrants	Winner	Ref.
1st	April 29, 2016	Bueng Phlan Chai outdoor public stage, Mueang Roi Et, Roi Et	20	Suwanna Pala	
2nd (Note: As an inter-provincial pageant with Miss Grand Yasothon–Miss Grand Maha Sarakham.)	May 14, 2017	Rajabhat Maha Sarakham University, Mueang Maha Sarakham	29	Thanyaporn Phongkun	
3rd	May 13, 2018	Robinson Lifestyle Roi Et, Mueang Roi Et, Roi Et	20	Piyaphon Chaisongkram	
4th (Note: As an inter-provincial pageant with Miss Grand Amnat Charoen.)	May 24, 2019	Petcharat Garden Hotel, Mueang Roi Et, Roi Et	16	Kobkaew Sriratda	
5th	August 9, 2020	Petcharat Garden Hotel, Mueang Roi Et, Roi Et	13	Atita Payak	
6th	December 19, 2021	Petcharat Garden Hotel, Mueang Roi Et, Roi Et	20	Jaruwan Momphraneaw	
7th	February 20, 2023	Petcharat Garden Hotel, Mueang Roi Et, Roi Et	16	Kanyakorn Narathorn	
8th	December 25, 2023	Petcharat Garden Hotel, Mueang Roi Et, Roi Et	16	Thasupang Decha-Akkaranan	
9th	January 12, 2025	Robinson Lifestyle Roi Et, Mueang Roi Et, Roi Et	10	Kanchutikanchan Peerthanatkul	

== National competition ==
The following is a list of Roi Et representatives who competed at the Miss Grand Thailand pageant.

Year	Representative		Original provincial title	Placement at Miss Grand Thailand	Provincial director	Ref.
Year	Romanized name	Thai name	Original provincial title	Placement at Miss Grand Thailand	Provincial director	Ref.
2016	Suwanna Pala	สุวรรณา พาลา	Miss Grand Roi Et 2016	Unplaced	Chinchot Thapabut	
2017	Thanyaporn Phongkun	ธันยาพร พงษ์กุล	Miss Grand Roi Et 2017	Unplaced	Preemart Hemathulin	
2018	Piyaphon Chaisongkram	ปิยภรณ์ ไชยสงคราม	Miss Grand Roi Et 2018	Unplaced	Yuranan Chantaya	
2019	Kobkaew Sriratda	กอบแก้ว ศรีรัดดา	Miss Grand Roi Et 2019	Top 20	Yuranan Chantaya	
2020	Atita Payak	อทิตา พยัคฆ์	Miss Grand Roi Et 2020	Unplaced	Yuranan Chantaya	
2021	No national pageant due to the COVID-19 pandemic.					
2022	Jaruwan Momphraneaw	จารุวรรณ ม่อมพระเนาว์	Miss Grand Roi Et 2021/22	Unplaced	Yuranan Chantaya	
2023	Kanyakorn Narathorn	กันยกร นราทร	Miss Grand Roi Et 2023	Unplaced	Yuranan Chantaya	
2024	Thasupang Decha-Akkaranan	ฐาสุปางค์ เดชะอัครอนันต์	Miss Grand Roi Et 2024	Unplaced	Yuranan Chantaya	
2025	Kanchutikanchan Peerthanatkul	กัญชุติกาญจน์ พีร์ธนัทกุล	Miss Grand Roi Et 2025		Kasetsuk Sukhongthong	
