= Miss Grand Yasothon =

Provincial pageant in Yasothon, Thailand

Miss Grand ฺYasothon มิสแกรนด์ยโสธร
- Formation: April 2, 2016; 10 years ago
- Founder: Preemart Hemathulin
- Type: Beauty pageant
- Headquarters: Yasothon
- Location: Thailand
- Official language: Thai
- Director: Sunaree Kongsomkaew (2024–present)
- Affiliations: Miss Grand Thailand

Summary result of Yasothon representatives at Miss Grand Thailand
Placement	Number(s)
Winner	0
1st runner-up	0
2nd runner-up	0
3rd runner-up	0
4th runner-up	0
Top 10/11/12	0
Top 20/21	0
Unplaced	8

Miss Grand Yasothon (Thai: มิสแกรนด์ยโสธร) is a Thai provincial beauty pageant which selects a representative from Yasothon province to the Miss Grand Thailand national competition. It was founded in 2016 by an event organizer company Double B Management, chaired by Preemart Hemathulin (ปรีมาศ เหมะธุลิน).

Yasothon representatives have yet to obtain any placement in the Miss Grand Thailand national competition.

== History ==
In 2016, after Miss Grand Thailand began franchising the provincial competitions to individual organizers, who would name seventy-seven provincial titleholders to compete in the national pageant. The license for Yasothon province was granted to an event organizer led by Preemart Hemathulin, who was also the licensee for other 4 Isan contests, including Maha Sarakham, Surin, Nakhon Phanom, and Amnat Charoen. The first Miss Grand Yasothon was co-organized with the four mentioned contests on May 24, 2016, in Mueang Maha Sarakham, where a business management student Patcharee Khunkaew (พัชรี คุณแก้ว) was named Miss Grand Yasothon.

In the early years, the pageant was always co-organized with other provincial pageants. It became a stand-alone pageant in 2023 under the directorship of Akarapol Waengwan (อัครพล แวงวรรณ).

The pageant was skipped once; in 2021, due to the COVID-19 pandemic in Thailand, the national organizer was unable to organize the national event, and the country representative for the international tournament was appointed instead.

Winner gallery

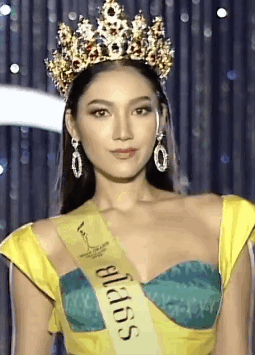
Pitchaphorn Petkhaew,
Miss Grand Yasothon 2022

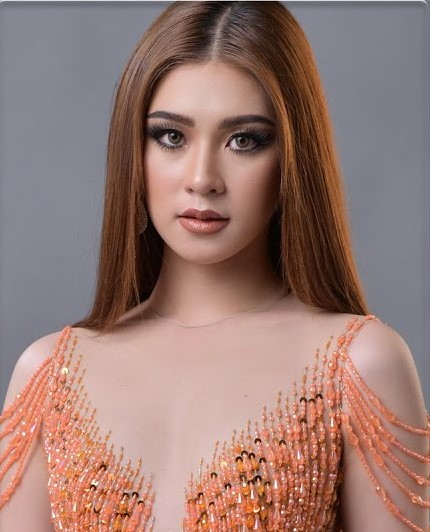
Savitree Kanasart,
Miss Grand Yasothon 2023

== Editions ==
The following table details Miss Grand Yasothon's annual editions since 2016.

Edition	Date	Final venue	Entrants	Winner	Ref.
1st (Note: As an inter-provincial pageant with Miss Grand Maha Sarakham–Surin–Nakhon Phanom–Amnat Charoen.)	May 24, 2016	Marin Convention Hall, Mueang Maha Sarakham, Maha Sarakham	18	Patcharee Khunkaew (Note: Later resigned and another finalist, Phanthitra Khamwan, was elected as the replacement to compete nationally.)	
2nd (Note: As an inter-provincial pageant with Miss Grand Maha Sarakham–Roi Et.)	May 14, 2017	Rajabhat Maha Sarakham University, Mueang Maha Sarakham	29	Chittanan Chuaychaithanapon	
3rd (Note: As an inter-provincial pageant with Miss Grand Udon Thani–Amnat Charoen.)	May 26, 2018	Boonthavorn Shopping Center, Mueang Udon Thani, Udon Thani	17	Ladawan Chaisaeng	
4th (Note: As an inter-provincial pageant with Miss Grand Mukdahan–Kalasin.)	May 29, 2019	80th Anniversary Chalermprakiat Auditorium, Kalasin Provincial Hall	25	Preepada Chimraroeng	
5th (Note: As an inter-provincial pageant with Miss Grand Buriram–Surin–Amnat Charoen.)	August 9, 2020	Multipurpose Dome, Buriram Municipality, Buriram	20	Rinlapat Pathomkittiroj	
6th (Note: As an inter-provincial pageant with the Miss Grand Mukdahan contest.)	February 12, 2022	J.P.Emerald Hotel, Mueang Yasothon, Yasothon	13	Pitchaphorn Petchkaew	
7th	February 28, 2023	Rakpayom Auditorium, Yasothon Technical College, Mueang Yasothon	7	Savitri Khanasart	
8th	January 6, 2024	Chaiyakunphanit Rice Mill, Loeng Nok Tha, Yasothon	9	Atittiya Priyathanasakun	
9th	January 10, 2025	Palermo Baked & Brewed, Mueang Yasothon	7	Melinya Pronsinchaowanan	

== National competition ==
The following is a list of Yasothon representatives who competed at the Miss Grand Thailand pageant.

Year	Representative		Original provincial title	Placement at Miss Grand Thailand	Provincial director	Ref.
Year	Romanized name	Thai name	Original provincial title	Placement at Miss Grand Thailand	Provincial director	Ref.
2016	Phanthitra Khamwan	พันธิตรา คำวัน	Miss Grand Isan 5 Provinces 2016 Finalist	Unplaced	Preemart Hemathulin	
2017	Chittanan Chuaychaithanapon	จิตตานันท์ ช่วยชัยธนพล	Miss Grand Yasothon 2017	Unplaced	Preemart Hemathulin	
2018	Ladawan Chaisang (Dethroned)	ลดาวัลย์ ชัยแสง (ปลด)	Miss Grand Yasothon 2018	Unplaced	Yuranan Chantaya	
2019	Preepada Chimraroeng	ปรีพดา ฉิมระเริง	Miss Grand Yasothon 2019	Unplaced	Keravit Petchjul	
2020	Rinlapat Pathomkittiroj	รินทร์ลภัส ปฐมกิตติโรจน์	Miss Grand Yasothon 2020	Unplaced	Sakparin Kasemthanapat	
2021	No national pageant due to the COVID-19 pandemic.					
2022	Pitchaphorn Petchkaew	พิชชาพร เพชรแก้ว	Miss Grand Yasothon 2021/22	Unplaced	Natthaphat Moollao	
2023	Savitri Khanasart	สาวิตรี คณะศาสตร์	Miss Grand Yasothon 2023	Unplaced	Akarapol Waengwan	
2024	Atittiya Priyathanasakun	อทิตติยา ปรีญาธนสกุล	Miss Grand Yasothon 2024	Unplaced	Sunaree Kongsomkaew	
2025	Melinya Pronsinchaowanan	เมลินญาน์ พรสินเชาวนันท์	Miss Grand Yasothon 2025		Sunaree Kongsomkaew	
