= Miss Grand Nakhon Phanom =

Provincial pageant in Nakhon Phanom, Thailand

Miss Grand ฺNakhon Phanom มิสแกรนด์นครพนม
- Formation: May 24, 2016; 9 years ago
- Founder: Preemart Hemathulin
- Type: Beauty pageant
- Headquarters: Nakhon Phanom
- Location: Thailand
- Official language: Thai
- Director: Nuntit Manitkul (2023–present)
- Affiliations: Miss Grand Thailand

Summary result of Nakhon Phanom representatives at Miss Grand Thailand
Placement	Number(s)
Winner	1
1st runner-up	0
2nd runner-up	0
3rd runner-up	0
4th runner-up	0
Top 10/11/12	1
Top 20/21	3
Unplaced	3

Miss Grand Nakhon Phanom (Thai: มิสแกรนด์นครพนม) is a Thai provincial beauty pageant which selects a representative from Nakhon Phanom province to the Miss Grand Thailand national competition. It was founded in 2016 by an event organizer company Double B Management, chaired by Preemart Hemathulin (ปรีมาศ เหมะธุลิน).

Nakhon Phanom produced one Miss Grand Thailand, Arayha Suparurk, who won the contest in 2019. Another highlight achievement was the fifth runner-up, won in 2023 by Kamonwalai Prajakrattanakul, who was later sent to participate in a Chinese/Thai reality competition show, Chuang Asia: Thailand, and was elected as one of the final 9 members debuting as Gen1es.

== History ==
In 2016, after Miss Grand Thailand began franchising the provincial competitions to individual organizers, who would name seventy-seven provincial titleholders to compete in the national pageant. The license for Nakhon Phanom province was granted to an event organizer led by Preemart Hemathulin, who was also the licensee for other 4 Isan contests, including Yasothon, Amnat Charoen, Surin, and Maha Sarakham. The first Miss Grand Nakhon Phanom was co-organized with the four mentioned contests on May 24, 2016, in Mueang Maha Sarakham, where an entrepreneur Lalittaphat Janchot was named Miss Grand Nakhon Phanom.

In addition to the 2016 contest, the pageant was organized outside Nakhon Phanom province twice: the 2022 edition in Bangkok and the 2025 one in Nonthaburi.

The pageant was skipped once; in 2021, due to the COVID-19 pandemic in Thailand, the national organizer was unable to organize the national event, and the country representative for the international tournament was appointed instead.

Winner gallery

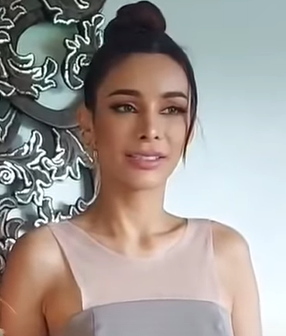
Arayha Suparurk,
Miss Grand Nakhon Phanom 2022

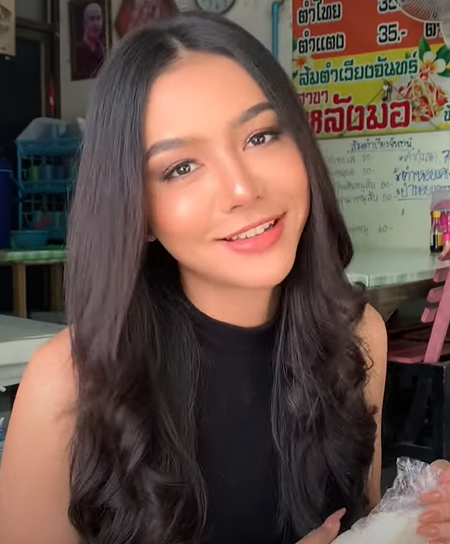
Panida Kheunjinda,
Miss Grand Nakhon Phanom 2022

== Editions ==
The following table details Miss Grand Nakhon Phanom's annual editions since 2016.

Edition	Date	Final venue	Entrants	Winner	Ref.
1st (Note: As an inter-provincial pageant with Miss Grand Maha Sarakham–Amnat Charoen–Surin–Yasothon.)	May 24, 2016	Marin Convention Hall, Mueang Maha Sarakham, Maha Sarakham	18	Lalittaphat Janchot	
2nd	February 26, 2017	IHotel, Mueang Nakhon Phanom, Nakhon Phanom	8	Eknaree Thumthong	
3rd	May 30, 2018	Fortune River View Hotel, Mueang Nakhon Phanom, Nakhon Phanom	11	Chalittha Wanphakdee	
4th	April 5, 2019	Phanomnaka Square, Mueang Nakhon Phanom, Nakhon Phanom	11	Arayha Suparurk	
5th	August 8, 2020	Pak Ping Ing Khong Hotel, Mueang Nakhon Phanom, Nakhon Phanom	5	Nantawan Phongphithak	
6th	February 13, 2022	Compost Studio, Wang Thonglang, Bangkok	5	Phanida Kheunjinda	
7th	September 25, 2022	Fortune River View Hotel, Mueang Nakhon Phanom, Nakhon Phanom	10	Kamonwalai Prajakrattanakul	
8th	October 14, 2023	Fortune River View Hotel, Mueang Nakhon Phanom, Nakhon Phanom	12	Sasicha Duangket	
9th	September 25, 2024	Central Chaengwattana, Pak Kret, Nonthaburi	12	Cherlin Krai-arayapat	

== National competition ==
The following is a list of Nakhon Phanom representatives who competed at the Miss Grand Thailand pageant.

Year	Representative		Original provincial title	Placement at Miss Grand Thailand	Provincial director	Ref.
Year	Romanized name	Thai name	Original provincial title	Placement at Miss Grand Thailand	Provincial director	Ref.
2016	Lalittaphat Janchot	ลลิตภัทร จันทร์โชติ	Miss Grand Nakhon Phanom 2016	Unplaced	Preemart Hemathulin	
2017	Eknaree Thumthong	เอกนรี ทุมทอง	Miss Grand Nakhon Phanom 2017	Unplaced	Preemart Hemathulin	
2018	Chalittha Wanphakdee	ชลิตตา วันภักดี	Miss Grand Nakhon Phanom 2018	Top 20	Phanthira Nichayasureekun	
2019	Arayha Suparurk	อารยะ ศุภฤกษ์	Miss Grand Nakhon Phanom 2019	Winner	Fon Thammasa	
2020	Nantawan Phongphithak	นันทวรรณ พงษ์พิทักษ์	Miss Grand Nakhon Phanom 2020	Top 20	Fon Thammasa	
2021	No national pageant due to the COVID-19 pandemic.					
2022	Phanida Kheunjinda	พนิดา เขื่อนจินดา	Miss Grand Nakhon Phanom 2021/22	Unplaced	Fon Thammasa	
2023	Kamonwarai Prajakrattanakul	กมลวลัย ประจักษ์รัตนกุล	Miss Grand Nakhon Phanom 2023	5th runner-up	Nuntit Manitkul	
2024	Sasicha Duangket	ศศิชา ดวงเกตุ	Miss Grand Nakhon Phanom 2024	Top 20	Nuntit Manitkul	
2025	Cherlin Krai-arayapat	เฌอลินณ์ ไกรอารยะพัทธ์	Miss Grand Nakhon Phanom 2025	Top 20	Nuntit Manitkul	
