= Miss Grand Maha Sarakham =

Provincial pageant in Maha Sarakham, Thailand

Miss Grand ฺMaha Sarakham มิสแกรนด์มหาสารคาม
- Formation: May 24, 2016; 9 years ago
- Founder: Preemart Hemathulin
- Type: Beauty pageant
- Headquarters: Maha Sarakham
- Location: Thailand
- Official language: Thai
- Director: Pawornrat Prasertsukho (2020, 2023–present)
- Affiliations: Miss Grand Thailand

Summary result of Maha Sarakham representatives at Miss Grand Thailand
Placement	Number(s)
Winner	0
1st runner-up	0
2nd runner-up	0
3rd runner-up	0
4th runner-up	1
Top 10/11/12	0
Top 20/21	0
Unplaced	7

Miss Grand Maha Sarakham (Thai: มิสแกรนด์มหาสารคาม) is a Thai provincial beauty pageant which selects a representative from Maha Sarakham province to the Miss Grand Thailand national competition. It was founded in 2016 by an event organizer company Double B Management, chaired by Preemart Hemathulin (ปรีมาศ เหมะธุลิน).

Maha Sarakham representatives have yet to win the Miss Grand Thailand title. The highest and only placement they obtained in the contest was the 4th runner-up, won in 2024 by Aoratai Phangchan.

== History ==
In 2016, after Miss Grand Thailand began franchising the provincial competitions to individual organizers, who would name seventy-seven provincial titleholders to compete in the national pageant. The license for Maha Sarakham province was granted to an event organizer led by Preemart Hemathulin, who was also the licensee for other 4 Isan contests, including Yasothon, Surin, Nakhon Phanom, and Amnat Charoen. The first Miss Grand Maha Sarakham was co-organized with the four mentioned contests on May 24, 2016, in Mueang Maha Sarakham, where an actress Tatiya Sonsakun was named Miss Grand Maha Sarakham.

In addition to the 2016 edition, the pageant was co-organized with other provincial stages several times; with Miss Grand Yasothon–Roi Et in 2017, and with Miss Grand Kalasin in 2020, 2022, and 2024.

The pageant was skipped once; in 2021, due to the COVID-19 pandemic in Thailand, the national organizer was unable to organize the national event, and the country representative for the international tournament was appointed instead.

Winner gallery

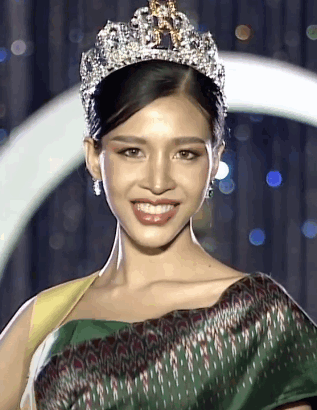
Wanlaya Thongchom,
Miss Grand Maha Sarakham 2022

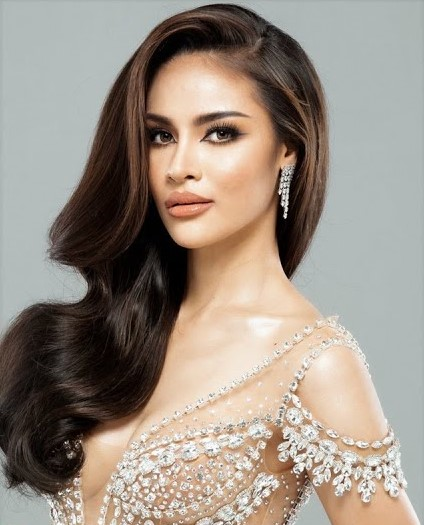
Sumintra Kokat,
Miss Grand Maha Sarakham 2023

== Editions ==
The following table details Miss Grand Maha Sarakham's annual editions since 2016.

Edition	Date	Final venue	Entrants	Winner	Ref.
1st (Note: As an inter-provincial pageant with Miss Grand Yasothon–Surin–Nakhon Phanom–Amnat Charoen.)	May 24, 2016	Marin Convention Hall, Mueang Maha Sarakham, Maha Sarakham	18	Tatiya Sonsakun	
2nd (Note: As an inter-provincial pageant with Miss Grand Yasothon–Roi Et.)	May 14, 2017	Rajabhat Maha Sarakham University, Mueang Maha Sarakham	29	Somying Somsapsin	
3rd	May 30, 2018	Sermthai Complex, Mueang Maha Sarakham, Maha Sarakham	15	Patittha Thosanthad	
4th	May 12, 2019	Sermthai Complex, Mueang Maha Sarakham, Maha Sarakham	15	Arisa Ricker	
5th (Note: As an inter-provincial pageant with Miss Grand Kalasin.)	August 8, 2020	S-Tawan Hotel & Convention, Mueang Maha Sarakham, Maha Sarakham	23	Janya Tonngam	
6th	November 28, 2021	Chada View Resort, Mueang Kalasin, Kalasin	22	Wanlaya Thongchom	
7th	February 3, 2023	Taksila Hotel, Mueang Maha Sarakham, Maha Sarakham	12	Sumintra Kokat	
8th	October 8, 2023	Taksila Hotel, Mueang Maha Sarakham, Maha Sarakham	12	Oratai Phangchan	
9th	November 10, 2024	80th Anniversary Hall, Rajabhat Maha Sarakham University	11	Natnicha Si-thao	

== National competition ==
The following is a list of Maha Sarakham representatives who competed at the Miss Grand Thailand pageant.

Year	Representative		Original provincial title	Placement at Miss Grand Thailand	Provincial director	Ref.
Year	Romanized name	Thai name	Original provincial title	Placement at Miss Grand Thailand	Provincial director	Ref.
2016	Tatiya Sonsakun	ตติยา สนสกุล	Miss Grand Maha Sarakham 2016	Unplaced	Preemart Hemathulin	
2017	Somying Somsapsin	สมหญิง สมทรัพย์สิน	Miss Grand Maha Sarakham 2017	Unplaced	Preemart Hemathulin	
2018	Patittha Thosanthad	ปทิตญา โทสันทัด	Miss Grand Maha Sarakham 2018	Unplaced	Thanakrit Phongsai	
2019	Arisa Ricker	อริสา เริกเคอร์	Miss Grand Maha Sarakham 2019	Unplaced	Kesinee Meesakunthaworn	
2020	Janya Tonngam	จรรยา ต้นงาม	Miss Grand Maha Sarakham 2020	Unplaced	Pawornrat Prasertsukho	
2021	No national pageant due to the COVID-19 pandemic.					
2022	Wanlaya Thongchom	วัลยา ทองโฉม	Miss Grand Maha Sarakham 2021/22	Unplaced	Kesinee Meesakunthaworn	
2023	Sumintra Kokat	สุมินตรา โคกัต	Miss Grand Maha Sarakham 2023	Unplaced	Pawornrat Prasertsukho	
2024	Aoratai Phangchan	อรทัย พังจันทร์	Miss Grand Maha Sarakham 2024	4th runner-up	Pawornrat Prasertsukho	
2025	Natnicha Si-thao	ณัฐนิชา สีเทา	Miss Grand Maha Sarakham 2025	Unplaced	Pawornrat Prasertsukho	
