= Miss Grand Surin =

Provincial pageant in Surin, Thailand

Miss Grand Surin มิสแกรนด์สุรินทร์
- Formation: May 24, 2016; 10 years ago
- Founder: Preemart Hemathulin
- Type: Beauty pageant
- Headquarters: Surin
- Location: Thailand
- Official language: Thai
- Director: Kantapat Keeratipatthanakorn (2025)
- Current titleholder: Rinlita Thanasathianthaweekit
- Affiliations: Miss Grand Thailand

Summary result of Surin representatives at Miss Grand Thailand
Placement	Number(s)
Winner	0
1st runner-up	0
2nd runner-up	0
3rd runner-up	0
4th runner-up	0
Top 10/11/12	1
Top 20/21	1
Unplaced	6

Miss Grand Surin (Thai: มิสแกรนด์สุรินทร์) is a Thai provincial beauty pageant which selects a representative from Surin province to the Miss Grand Thailand national competition. It was founded in 2016 by an event organizer company Double B Management, chaired by Preemart Hemathulin (ปรีมาศ เหมะธุลิน).

Surin representatives have yet to win the Miss Grand Thailand title. The highest placement they obtained in the contest was in the top 12 finalists, achieved in 2018 by Pantawan Singsen.

== History ==
In 2016, after Miss Grand Thailand began franchising the provincial competitions to individual organizers, who would name seventy-seven provincial titleholders to compete in the national pageant. The license for Surin province was granted to an event organizer led by Preemart Hemathulin, who was also the licensee for other 4 Isan contests, including Yasothon, Amnat Charoen, Nakhon Phanom, and Maha Sarakham. The first Miss Grand Surin was co-organized with the four mentioned contests on May 24, 2016, in Mueang Maha Sarakham, where an entrepreneur Sasinapa Alairam was named Miss Grand Surin.

In addition to the 2016 edition, the pageant was also co-organized with other provincial stages in 2020 and 2025; with Miss Grand Buriram–Amnat Charoen–Yasothon, and Miss Grand Nakhon Si Thammarat–Sukhothai, respectively.

The pageant was skipped once; in 2021, due to the COVID-19 pandemic in Thailand, the national organizer was unable to organize the national event, and the country representative for the international tournament was appointed instead.

=== Winners ===
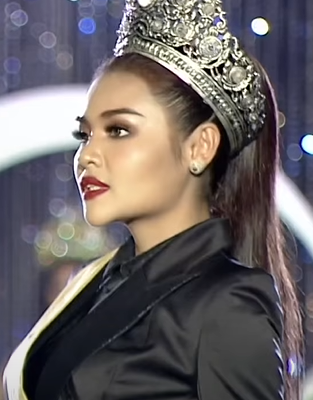
Pa-ornrat Pinmueang,
Miss Grand Surin 2022

== Editions ==
The following table details Miss Grand Surin's annual editions since 2016.

Edition	Date	Final venue	Entrants	Winner	Ref.
1st (Note: As an inter-provincial pageant with Miss Grand Maha Sarakham–Amnat Charoen–Nakhon Phanom–Yasothon.)	May 24, 2016	Marin Convention Hall, Mueang Maha Sarakham, Maha Sarakham	18	Sasinapa Alairam	
2nd	March 13, 2017	Robinson Lifestyle Surin, Mueang Surin, Surin	10	Wassana Inchomngam (Note: Later dethroned and the top 10 finalist, Pawiporn Wisansartbamrung, was assigned as the replacement to compete in the 2017 national pageant.)	
3rd	April 29, 2018	Robinson Lifestyle Surin, Mueang Surin, Surin	17	Pantawan Singsen	
4th	April 11, 2019	Robinson Lifestyle Surin, Mueang Surin, Surin	17	Montita Trakoonsa-nganet	
5th (Note: As an inter-provincial pageant with Miss Grand Buriram–Amnat Charoen–Yasothon.)	August 9, 2020	Multipurpose Dome, Buriram Municipality, Buriram	20	Jenjira Janthong	
6th	February 6, 2022	Thongtarin Hotel, Mueang Surin, Surin	7	Pa-ornrat Pinmuang	
7th	November 13, 2022	Rajamangala University of Technology Isan, Surin Campus, Mueang Surin	15	Khanaporn Phatthanaphan	
8th	November 29, 2023	TaoSaren Market, Prasat, Surin	8	Selina Hodgkiss	
9th (Note: As an inter-provincial pageant with Miss Grand Nakhon Si Thammarat–Sukhothai.)	September 14, 2024	The National Theatre's Community Hall, Nakhon Si Thammarat	15	Rinlita Thanasathianthaweekit	

== National competition ==
The following is a list of Surin representatives who competed at the Miss Grand Thailand pageant.

Year	Representative		Original provincial title	Placement at Miss Grand Thailand	Provincial director	Ref.
Year	Romanized name	Thai name	Original provincial title	Placement at Miss Grand Thailand	Provincial director	Ref.
2016	Sasinapa Alairam	ศศินภา อาลัยรัมย์	Miss Grand Surin 2016	Unplaced	Preemart Hemathulin	
2017	Wassana Inchomngam	วาสนา อินโฉมงาม	Miss Grand Surin 2017	Dethroned	Preemart Hemathulin	
2017	Pawiporn Wisansartbamrung	ปวีณ์พร วิศาลศาสตร์บำรุง	Top 10 – Miss Grand Surin 2017	Unplaced	Preemart Hemathulin	
2018	Pantawan Singsen	ปานตะวัน สิงห์เสน	Miss Grand Surin 2018	Top 12	Amnat Senkram	
2019	Monthita Trakulsa-nganet	มณฑิตา ตระกูลสง่าเนตร	Miss Grand Surin 2019	Unplaced	Amnat Senkram	
2020	Jenjira Janthong	เจนจิรา จันทอง	Miss Grand Surin 2020	Unplaced	Sakparin Kasemthanapat	
2021	No national pageant due to the COVID-19 pandemic.					
2022	Pa-ornrat Pinmuang	ปอรรัตน์ ปิ่นเมือง	Miss Grand Surin 2021/22	Top 20	Jindapat Phonpitak	
2023	Khanaporn Phatthanaphan	คณาพร พัฒนพันธ์	Miss Grand Surin 2023	Unplaced	Hatsachai Ruangying	
2024	Selina Hodgkiss	ซาลิน่า ฮอล์จคิสส์	Miss Grand Surin 2024	Unplaced	Jennipa Borompattharakorn	
2025	Rinlita Thanasathianthaweekit	รินทร์ลิตา ธนเสถียรทวีกิจ	Miss Grand Surin 2025	Unplaced	Kantapat Keeratipatthanakorn	
