= Miss Grand Buriram =

Provincial pageant in Buriram, Thailand

Miss Grand Buriram มิสแกรนด์บุรีรัมย์
- Formation: May 15, 2016; 10 years ago
- Founder: Awirut Akkabut
- Type: Beauty pageant
- Headquarters: Buriram
- Location: Thailand
- Official language: Thai
- Director: Panicha Thanaseelangkun (2024)
- Affiliations: Miss Grand Thailand

Summary result of Buriram representatives at Miss Grand Thailand
Placement	Number(s)
Winner	0
1st runner-up	1
2nd runner-up	0
3rd runner-up	1
4th runner-up	0
Top 10/11/12	0
Top 20/21	2
Unplaced	5

Miss Grand Buriram (Thai: มิสแกรนด์บุรีรัมย์) is a Thai provincial beauty pageant which selects a representative from Buriram province to the Miss Grand Thailand national competition. It was founded in 2016 by a Sisaket-based producer Awirut Akkabut (อวิรุทธ์ อรรคบุตร).

Buriram representatives have yet to win the Miss Grand Thailand title. The highest placement they obtained was the first runner up title, won by Panasaya Angelica Demaagd in 2026.

== History ==
In 2016, after Miss Grand Thailand began franchising the provincial competitions to individual organizers, who would name seventy-seven provincial titleholders to compete in the national pageant. The license for Buriram province was granted to a film producer from Sisaket, Awirut Akkabut, who organized the first Miss Grand Buriram pageant in Mueang Buriram on May 15 19, 2016, and named Phattiya Rattanajariya from Lam Plai Mat the winner. Akkabut relinquished the license to Supachai Chunhacha (ศุภชัย ชุนหชา) the following year.

The pageant was sometimes co-organized with other provincial pageants; with Miss Grand Surin–Yasothon–Amnat Charoen in 2020, and with Miss Grand Nakhon Ratchasima in 2023.

The pageant was skipped once; in 2021, due to the COVID-19 pandemic in Thailand, the national organizer was unable to organize the national event, and the country representative for the international tournament was appointed instead.

Winner gallery

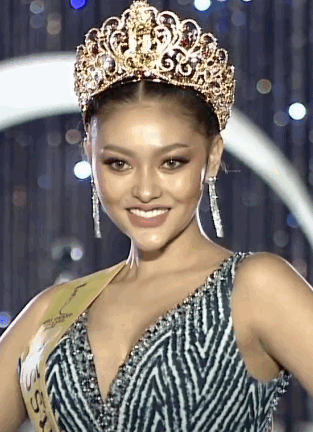
Kantima Nonthasit,
Miss Grand Buriram 2022

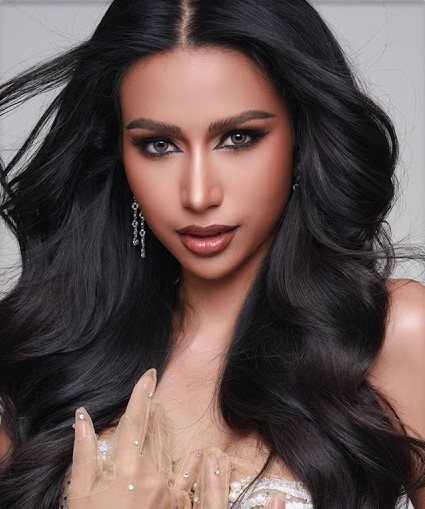
Kanyaphak Saengkaew,
Miss Grand Buriram 2023

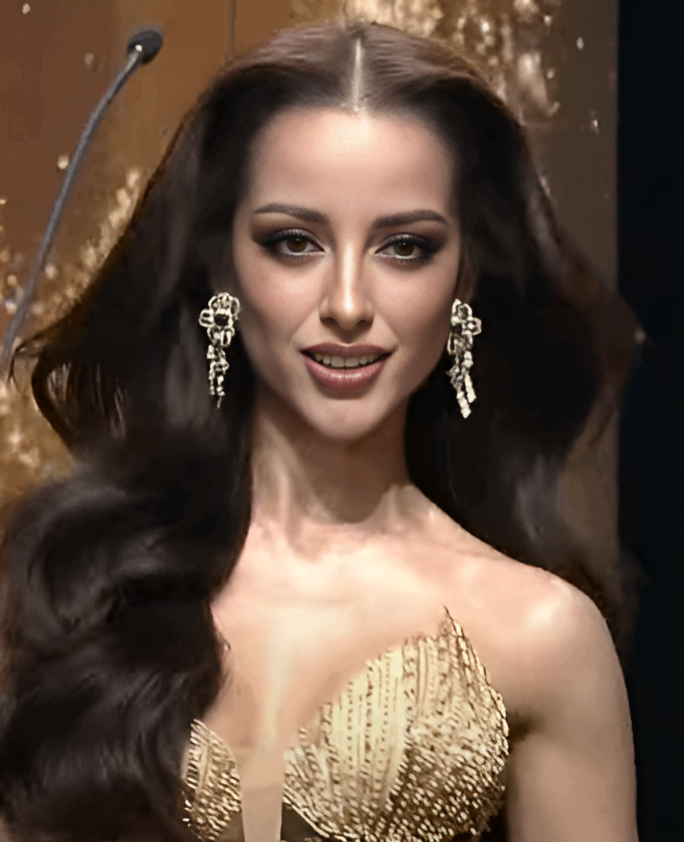
Amy Viranya Berry,
Miss Grand Buriram 2024

== Editions ==
The following table details Miss Grand Buriram's annual editions since 2016.

Edition	Date	Final venue	Entrants	Winner	Ref.
1st	May 15, 2016	Robinson Lifestyle Buriram, Mueang Buriram, Buriram	8	Phattiya Rattanajariya	
2nd	February 25, 2017	Buriram Castle, Mueang Buriram, Buriram	20	Punnapa Khantarat	
3rd	April 28, 2018	Old Buriram Provincial Hall, Mueang Buriram, Buriram	20	Nantapak Kraiha	
4th	May 7, 2019	Robinson Lifestyle Buriram, Mueang Buriram, Buriram	18	Rosarin Pitploen	
5th (Note: As an inter-provincial pageant for Miss Grand Buriram–Surin–Yasothon–Amnat Charoen.)	August 9, 2020	Multipurpose Dome, Buriram Municipality, Buriram	20	Natthida Phuengnum	
6th	February 16, 2022	Varavela Garden Hall, Bueng Kum, Bangkok	7	Kantima Nonthasit	
7th (Note: As an inter-provincial pageant for Miss Grand Nakhon Ratchasima–Buriram.)	December 25, 2022	MCC Hall, The Mall Nakhon Ratchasima, Mueang Nakhon Ratchasima	17	Kanyaphak Saengkaew	
8th	January 13, 2024	Robinson Lifestyle Buriram, Mueang Buriram, Buriram	15	Viranya Berry	
9th	December 14, 2024	Robinson Lifestyle Buriram, Mueang Buriram, Buriram	13	Chalinee Sinsawat	

== National competition ==
The following is a list of Buriram representatives who competed at the Miss Grand Thailand pageant.

Year	Representative		Original provincial title	Placement at Miss Grand Thailand	Provincial director	Ref.
Year	Romanized name	Thai name	Original provincial title	Placement at Miss Grand Thailand	Provincial director	Ref.
2016	Phattiya Rattanajariya	ภัททิยา รัตนจริยา	Miss Grand Buriram 2016	Unplaced	Awirut Akkabut	
2017	Punnapa Khantarat	ปุณณภา ขันธรัตน์	Miss Grand Buriram 2017	Top 20	Supachai Chunhacha	
2018	Nantapak Kraiha	นันทภัค ไกรหา	Miss Grand Buriram 2018	3rd runner-up	Supachai Chunhacha	
2019	Rosarin Pitploen	รสริน พิศเพลิน	Miss Grand Buriram 2019	Unplaced	Amnat Senkhram	
2020	Natthida Phuengnum	ณัฐธิดา พึ่งนุ่ม	Miss Grand Buriram 2020	Unplaced	Sakparin Kasemthanapat	
2021	No national pageant due to the COVID-19 pandemic.					
2022	Kantima Nonthasit	กานต์ติมา นนทสิทธิ์	Miss Grand Buriram 2021/22	Unplaced	Parattakorn Poonphan, and others	
2023	Kanyaphak Saengkaew	กัญญาภัค แสงแก้ว	Miss Grand Buriram 2023	Unplaced	Supachai Chunhacha	
2024	Amy Viranya Berry	วิรัญญา เบอร์รี่	Miss Grand Buriram 2024	Top 20	Panicha Thanaseelangkun	
2025	Chalinee Sinsawat	ชาลินี สินสวัสดิ์	Miss Grand Buriram 2025	Unplaced	Panicha Thanaseelangkun	
2026	Panassaya Angelica DeMaagd	ปนัสยา แอนเจลิก้า ดีมากด์	Miss Grand Buriram 2026	1strunner-up	Thasanai Khodthong	
