= Miss Grand Mukdahan =

Provincial pageant in Mukdahan, Thailand

Miss Grand ฺMukdahan มิสแกรนด์มุกดาหาร
- Formation: April 2, 2016; 10 years ago
- Founder: Suriya Pansukha
- Type: Beauty pageant
- Headquarters: Bangkok
- Location: Thailand
- Official language: Thai
- Director: Kasidist Phuwitchayasamrit (2025)
- Affiliations: Miss Grand Thailand

Summary result of Mukdahan representatives at Miss Grand Thailand
Placement	Number(s)
Winner	0
1st runner-up	0
2nd runner-up	0
3rd runner-up	0
4th runner-up	1
Top 10/11/12	0
Top 20/21	2
Unplaced	5

Miss Grand Mukdahan (Thai: มิสแกรนด์มุกดาหาร) is a Thai provincial beauty pageant which selects a representative from Mukdahan province to the Miss Grand Thailand national competition. It was founded in 2016 by a social worker, Suriya Pansukha (สุริยา แป้นสุขา).

Mukdahan representatives have yet to win the Miss Grand Thailand title. The highest placement they obtained in the contest was the 4th runner-up, won in 2020 by Nutnicha Srithongsuk.

== History ==
In 2016, after Miss Grand Thailand began franchising the provincial competitions to individual organizers, who would name seventy-seven provincial titleholders to compete in the national pageant. The license for Mukdahan province was granted to a social worker, Suriya Pansukha, who organized the first Miss Grand Mukdahan contest on April 2, 2016, in Mueang Mukdahan and named Sarasrampha Noomhan (ศรัสรัมภา นูมหันต์) the winner. However, Noomhan was later dethroned and the first runner-up was assigned as the replacement to compete in the 2016 national contest. The license was transferred to Sanchai Wongnimitworakul the following year.

Occasionally, the pageant was co-organized with other provincial pageants; with Miss Grand Yasothon–Kalasin in 2019, with Miss Grand Yasothon in 2022, and with Miss Grand Suphan Buri in 2025.

The pageant was skipped once; in 2021, due to the COVID-19 pandemic in Thailand, the national organizer was unable to organize the national event, and the country representative for the international tournament was appointed instead.

Winner gallery

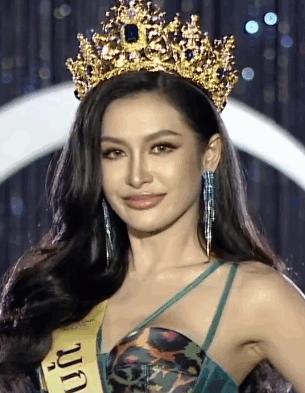
Marichsa Piue-ngam,
Miss Grand Mukdahan 2022

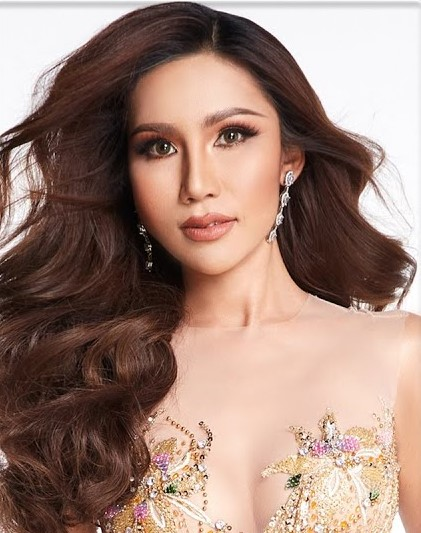
Chonticha Kulsuwan,
Miss Grand Mukdahan 2023

== Editions ==
The following table details Miss Grand Mukdahan's annual editions since 2016.

Edition	Date	Final venue	Entrants	Winner	Ref.
1st	April 2, 2016	River City Hotel, Mueang Mukdahan, Mukdahan	18	Sarasrampha Noomhan (Note: Later dethroned, and the first runner-up, Anyarat Hanmontri, was elected as the replacement.)	
2nd	April 28, 2017	River City Hotel, Mueang Mukdahan, Mukdahan	12	Waramporn Pan-in	
3rd	May 24, 2018	Robinson Lifestyle Mukdahan, Mueang Mukdahan, Mukdahan	16	Nanthika Ransri	
4th (Note: As an inter-provincial pageant with the Miss Grand Yasothon–Kalasin contests.)	May 29, 2019	80th Anniversary Chalermprakiat Auditorium, Kalasin Provincial Hall	25	Natpicha Pisarnpongchana	
5th	August 8, 2020	Hotel de Ladda, Mueang Mukdahan, Mukdahan	9	Nutnicha Srithongsuk	
6th (Note: As an inter-provincial pageant with the Miss Grand Yasothon contest.)	February 12, 2022	J.P. Emerald Hotel, Mueang Yasothon, Yasothon	13	Marichsa Phiue-ngam	
7th	February 24, 2023	Thai Watsadu Mukdahan's Parking lot, Mueang Mukdahan, Mukdahan	4	Chonthicha Kulsuwan	
8th	November 3, 2023	Arneak Pasong ChangChui, Bang Phlat, Bangkok	13	Nattha Intasao	
9th (Note: As an inter-provincial pageant with the Miss Grand Suphan Buri contest.)	October 1, 2024	Suban Hall, Don Mueang, Bangkok	13	Nathrika Sthapornnawakun	

== National competition ==
The following is a list of Mukdahan representatives who competed at the Miss Grand Thailand pageant.

Year	Representative		Original provincial title	Placement at Miss Grand Thailand	Provincial director	Ref.
Year	Romanized name	Thai name	Original provincial title	Placement at Miss Grand Thailand	Provincial director	Ref.
2016	Anyarat Hanmontri	อัญรัตน์ หาญมนตรี	1st runner-up Miss Grand Mukdahan 2016	Unplaced	Suriya Pansukha	
2017	Waramporn Pan-in	วรัมพร ปั้นอินทร์	Miss Grand Mukdahan 2017	Unplaced	Sanchai Wongnimitworakul	
2018	Nanthika Ransri	นันธิกา รันศรี	Miss Grand Mukdahan 2018	Unplaced	Nanthawich Wannasen	
2019	Natpicha Pisarnpongchana	ณัฏฐ์พิชา พิศาลพงศ์ชนะ	Miss Grand Mukdahan 2019	Unplaced	Keravit Petchjul	
2020	Nutnicha Srithongsuk	ณัฐณิชา ศรีทองสุก	Miss Grand Mukdahan 2020	4th runner-up	Natthaphat Moollao	
2021	No national pageant due to the COVID-19 pandemic.					
2022	Marichsa Piue-ngam	มาริชสา ผิวงาม	Miss Grand Mukdahan 2021/22	Top 20	Thanat Harintachinda	
2023	Chonthicha Kulsuwan	ชลธิชา กุลสุวรรณ	Miss Grand Mukdahan 2023	Unplaced	Abhisit Sirirat	
2024	Nattha Intasao	ณัฏฐา อินต๊ะซาว	Miss Grand Mukdahan 2024	Top 20	Tachaya Prathumwan	
2025	Nathrika Sthapornnawakun	ณัฐริกา สถาพรนวกุล	Miss Grand Mukdahan 2025		Kasidist Phuwitchayasamrit	
