= Miss Grand Suphan Buri =

Provincial pageant in Suphan Buri, Thailand

Miss Grand ฺSuphan Buri มิสแกรนด์สุพรรณบุรี
- Formation: May 30, 2016; 9 years ago
- Founder: Napasanan Kamolsitthiphan
- Type: Beauty pageant
- Headquarters: Suphan Buri
- Location: Thailand
- Official language: Thai
- Provincial Director: Tippawan Phuwitchayasamrit (2025)
- Affiliations: Miss Grand Thailand

Summary result of Suphan Buri representatives at Miss Grand Thailand
Placement	Number(s)
Winner	0
1st runner-up	0
2nd runner-up	0
3rd runner-up	0
4th runner-up	0
Top 10/11/12	0
Top 20/21	3
Unplaced	6

Miss Grand Suphan Buri (Thai: มิสแกรนด์สุพรรณบุรี) is a Thai provincial beauty pageant which selects a representative from Suphan Buri province to the Miss Grand Thailand national competition. It was founded in 2016 by an entrepreneur Napasanan Kamolsitthiphan (นภัสนันท์ กมลสิทธิพันธ์ุ).

Suphan Buri representatives have yet to win the Miss Grand Thailand title. The highest and only placement they obtained in the contest was in the top 20 finalists, achieved in 2020, 2024, and 2025.

== History ==
In 2016, after Miss Grand Thailand began franchising the provincial competitions to individual organizers, who would name seventy-seven provincial titleholders to compete in the national pageant. The license for Suphan Buri province was granted to a local entrepreneur Napasanan Kamolsitthiphan, who organized the first Miss Grand Kanchanaburi contest in May 2016 and named Parityaphat Khonthong the winner. Kamolsitthiphan relinquished the franchise to Patima Kritchamaiphak in 2018.

The pageant was skipped in 2021, due to the COVID-19 pandemic in Thailand, the national organizer was unable to organize the national event, and the country representative for the international tournament was appointed instead.

Winner gallery

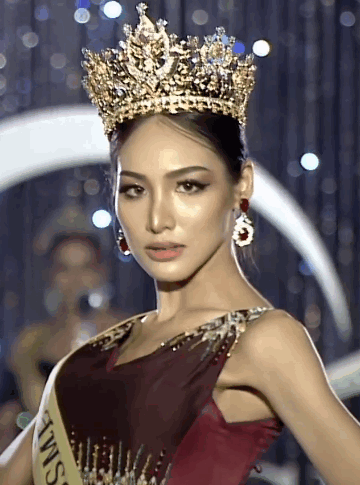
Thanatchaporn Pankaew,
Miss Grand Suphan Buri 2022

== Editions ==
The following table details Miss Grand Suphan Buri's annual editions since 2016.

Edition	Date	Final venue	Entrants	Winner	Ref.
1st	May 30, 2016	Sri U-Thong Grand Hotel, Mueang Suphan Buri, Suphan Buri	7	Parityaphat Khonthong	
2nd	May 13, 2017	Robinson Lifestyle Suphanburi, Mueang Suphan Buri, Suphan Buri	12	Chanyathorn Charoenwisan	
3rd (Note: Organized as an inter-provincial pageant with the Miss Grand Kanchanaburi and Miss Grand Chai Nat contests.)	May 26, 2018	Robinson Lifestyle Kanchanaburi, Mueang Kanchanaburi, Kanchanaburi	20	Manassanan Limchanprapab	
4th	May 26, 2019	Songphanburi Hotel, Mueang Suphan Buri, Suphan Buri	20	Olivier Manirote	
5th	July 26, 2020	Dragon Descendents Museum, Mueang Suphan Buri, Suphan Buri	10	Kanyanarat Munlee	
6th	January 30, 2022	Suan Dusit University Auditorium, Suphan Buri Campus	9	Thanatchaporn Pankaew	
7th	December 20, 2022	Central Chaengwattana, Pak Kret, Nonthaburi	16	Kanokporn Nuttayothin	
8th	October 18, 2023	Songphanburi Hotel, Mueang Suphan Buri, Suphan Buri	20	Kanokwan Nansungnern	
9th (Note: Organized as an inter-provincial pageant with the Miss Grand Mukdahan contest.)	October 1, 2024	Suban Hall, Don Mueang, Bangkok	13	Piyaporn Sangsuwan	

== National competition ==
The following is a list of Suphan Buri representatives who competed at the Miss Grand Thailand pageant.

Year	Representative		Original provincial title	Placement at Miss Grand Thailand	Provincial director	Ref.
Year	Romanized name	Thai name	Original provincial title	Placement at Miss Grand Thailand	Provincial director	Ref.
2016	Parityaphat Khonthong	ปริชญภัสร์ ขอนทอง	Miss Grand Suphan Buri 2016	Unplaced	Napasanan Kamolsitthiphan	
2017	Chanyathorn Charoenwisan	ชญาธร เจริญวิศาล	Miss Grand Suphan Buri 2017	Unplaced	Napasanan Kamolsitthiphan	
2018	Manassanan Limchanprapab	มนัสนันท์ ลิ้มจันทร์ประภาพ	Miss Grand Suphan Buri 2018	Unplaced	Patima Kritchamaiphak	
2019	Olivier Manirote	โอลิเวียร์ มณีโรจน์	Miss Grand Suphan Buri 2019	Unplaced	Manassanun Boonto	
2020	Kanyanarat Munlee	กัญญณรัชต์ หมุนลี	Miss Grand Suphan Buri 2020	Top 20	Sarankrit Nattawaramongkol	
2021	No national pageant due to the COVID-19 pandemic.					
2022	Thanatchaporn Pankaew	ธนัชพร พานแก้ว	Miss Grand Suphan Buri 2022	Unplaced	Nikhom Rienthing	
2023	Kanokporn Nuttayothin	กนกภรณ์ นุตตโยธิน	Miss Grand Suphan Buri 2023	Unplaced	Manit Salaitong	
2024	Kanokwan Nansoongnoen	กนกวรรณ นันสูงเนิน	Miss Grand Suphan Buri 2024	Top 20	Manit Salaitong	
2025	Piyaporn Sangsuwan	ปิยะพร สังข์สุวรรณ	Miss Grand Suphan Buri 2025	Top 20	Tippawan Phuwitchayasamrit	
