= Mueang Maha Sarakham district =

Mueang Maha Sarakham เมืองมหาสารคาม
- District
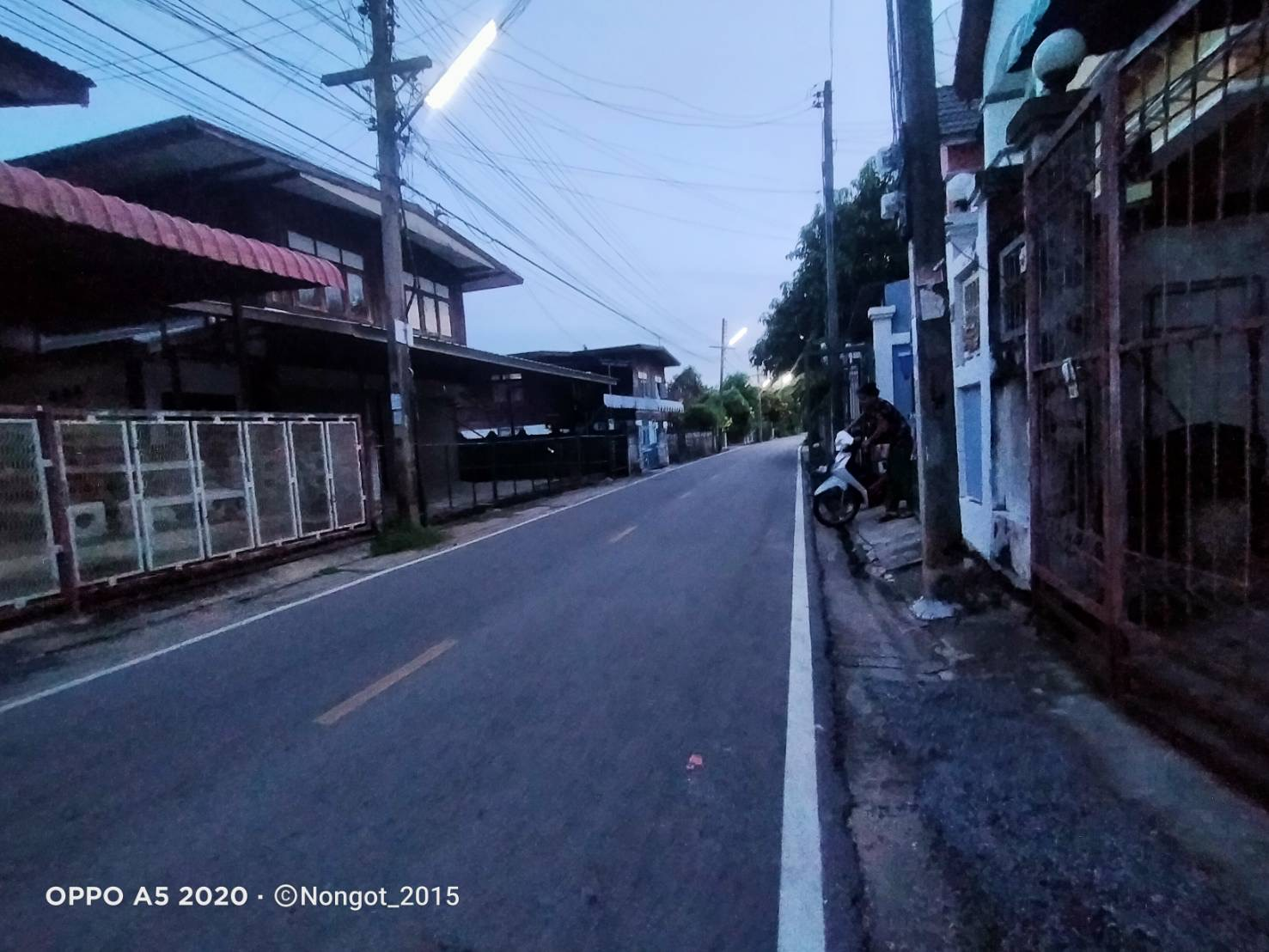
- Soi (alley) in Talat, Mueang Maha Sarakham

- District location in Maha Sarakham province
- Coordinates: 16°11′3″N 103°18′4″E
- Country: Thailand
- Province: Maha Sarakham

Area
  - Total: 556.7 km^{2} (214.9 sq mi)

Population (2005)
  - Total: 142,325
  - Density: 255.7/km^{2} (662/sq mi)
- Time zone: UTC+7 (ICT)
- Postal code: 44000
- Geocode: 4401

Mueang Maha Sarakham (Thai: เมืองมหาสารคาม) is the capital district (amphoe mueang) of Maha Sarakham province, northeastern Thailand.

== Geography ==
Neighboring districts are (from the south clockwise): Kae Dam, Wapi Pathum, Borabue, Kosum Phisai, and Kantharawichai of Maha Sarakham Province; Khong Chai of Kalasin province; and Changhan, Mueang Roi Et, and Si Somdet of Roi Et province.

== History ==
In 1913 the district name was changed from Uthai Sarakham to Mueang Maha Sarakham.

== Administration ==
The district is divided into 14 sub-districts (tambons), which are further subdivided into 182 villages (mubans). The town (thesaban mueang) Maha Sarakham covers the whole of tambon Talat. The township (thesaban tambon) Waeng Nang includes parts of tambon Waeng Nang. There are a further 13 tambon administrative organizations (TAO).

No.	Name	Thai name	Villages	Pop.
1.	Talat	ตลาด	-	40,298
2.	Khwao	เขวา	24	14,415
3.	Tha Tum	ท่าตูม	10	5,346
4.	Waeng Nang	แวงน่าง	17	12,997
5.	Khok Ko	โคกก่อ	16	8,104
6.	Don Wan	ดอนหว่าน	9	4,943
7.	Koeng	เกิ้ง	12	7,487
8.	Kaeng Loeng Chan	แก่งเลิงจาน	16	7,856
9.	Tha Song Khon	ท่าสองคอน	23	13,238
10.	Lat Phatthana	ลาดพัฒนา	19	7,650
11.	Nong Pling	หนองปลิง	8	5,050
12.	Huai Aeng	ห้วยแอ่ง	10	3,566
13.	Nong No	หนองโน	8	5,968
14.	Bua Kho	บัวค้อ	10	5,407
