= Miss Grand Thailand 2020 =

8th Miss Grand Thailand pageant

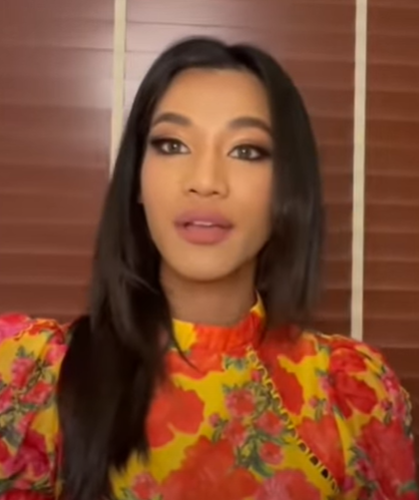
- Patcharaporn Chantarapadit of Ranong, the winner of the contest
- Date: 19 September 2020
- Presenters: Matthew Deane
- Venue: Bangkok International Trade and Exhibition Centre, Bangkok, Thailand
- Broadcaster: YouTube, Facebook Live
- Entrants: 77
- Placements: 21
- Winner: Patcharaporn Chantarapadit; Ranong
- Best National Costume: Tiiya Kitiya; Ratchaburi
- Best in Swimsuit: Suprang Mun Lee; Suphanburi
- Best Evening Gown: Wanida Dokmai; Chonburi

Miss Grand Thailand 2020 (Thai: มิสแกรนด์ไทยแลนด์ 2020) was the eighth edition of the Miss Grand Thailand beauty contest, held on 19 September 2020 at Bangkok International Trade and Exhibition Centre in Bangkok, Thailand. Miss Grand Thailand 2019, Arayha Suparurk of Nakhon Phanom, crowned Patcharaporn Chantarapadit of Ranong as her successor at the end of the event.

Delegates from seventy-seven provinces of Thailand have been expecting to compete, and the winner of which will represent the country at Miss Grand International 2020.

== Background ==
=== Location and date ===
The eighth edition of the Miss Grand Thailand beauty contest was scheduled to be held on 19 September 2020. The press conference of the contest was conducted at the Novotel Bangkok Suvarnabhumi Airport Hotel in Samut Prakan on 31 August, in which Chiang Rai was announced as the preliminary host province for the swimsuit contest, the darling of the host competition as well as all other ancillary activities, and the Bangkok International Trade and Exhibition Centre of Bangkok will be served as the venue for the national costume parade, preliminary competition, and the grand final coronation.

List of the main events in the Miss Grand Thailand 2020 pageant
Location	Date	Event	Venue	Ref.
Arrival: Samut Prakan (31 August – 4 September)	31 August	Thai Dress Fashion Show	Novotel Bangkok Suvarnabhumi Airport Hotel, Mueang Samut Prakan	
Arrival: Samut Prakan (31 August – 4 September)	4 September	Miss Grand Rising Star contest	Novotel Bangkok Suvarnabhumi Airport Hotel, Mueang Samut Prakan	
Arrival: Samut Prakan (31 August – 4 September)	4 September	Professional Salesman contest	Novotel Bangkok Suvarnabhumi Airport Hotel, Mueang Samut Prakan	
Preliminary host province: Chiang Rai (7 September – 9 September)	7 September	Lanna Fashion Show	Le Meridien Chiang Rai Resort, Chiang Rai	
Preliminary host province: Chiang Rai (7 September – 9 September)	8 September	Darling of the Host contest	Le Meridien Chiang Rai Resort, Chiang Rai	
Preliminary host province: Chiang Rai (7 September – 9 September)	9 September	Best in Swimwear contest	Le Meridien Chiang Rai Resort, Chiang Rai	
Final venue: Bangkok (16 September – 19 September)	16 September	Best in National Costume Contest	Bangkok International Trade and Exhibition Centre, Bang Na	
Final venue: Bangkok (16 September – 19 September)	17 September	Best in Evening Gown	Bangkok International Trade and Exhibition Centre, Bang Na	
Final venue: Bangkok (16 September – 19 September)	17 September	Preliminary competition	Bangkok International Trade and Exhibition Centre, Bang Na	
Final venue: Bangkok (16 September – 19 September)	19 September	Best Provincial Director	Bangkok International Trade and Exhibition Centre, Bang Na	
Final venue: Bangkok (16 September – 19 September)	19 September	Grand Final Coronation	Bangkok International Trade and Exhibition Centre, Bang Na	

== Competition ==
=== Thai Dress Fashion Show ===
In a press conference to welcome the contestants of Miss Grand Thailand 2020 (Welcome Ceremony Press Conference), which was held on August 31, 2020, at the Grand Ballroom, Novotel Suvarnabhumi Airport Hotel. Samut Prakan Province There was a walk in an applied Thai fabric dress by all 77 contestants, all of which were designed and sewed by Thai designers who brought local fabrics to sew into fashionable dresses under the concept of This is Me, This is Thailand: Thai Fabric in Lifestyle. The top 20 dresses that received the most votes via Facebook will be displayed in the exhibition of the contest.

Results	Contestants
Top 20	Bangkok; Chachoengsao; Chaiyaphum; Chiang Rai; Kalasin; Kamphaeng Phet; Kanchanaburi; Khon Kaen; Nakhon Nayok; Nakhon Ratchasima; Nakhon Si Thammarat; Nan; Phra Nakhon Si Ayutthaya; Phuket; Prachuap Khiri Khan; Ranong; Sisaket; Suphanburi; Ubon Ratchathani; Yasothon

=== Professional Sales Competition ===
The professional sales contest of the Miss Grand Thailand 2020 contest was held on September 4, 2020, via the Dot Aris application's live-commerce system. The 77 contestants were divided into 11 teams of 7 contestants each, which teams can make sales of the contest's products. Through the application Dot Aris, the group that got the most value received prize money of 70,000 baht from Storage City Platform Company Limited

Results	Contestants
Winner (Group 2)	Kanchanaburi; Phuket; Ranong; Ratchaburi; Roi Et; Sakon Nakhon; Yasothon

Group	Contestant
Group 1	Nakhon Phanom; Phra Nakhon Si Ayutthaya; Phrae; Rayong; Samut Sakhon; Singburi; Suphanburi
Group 3	Ang Thong; Bangkok; Bueng Kan; Chai Nat; Khon Kaen; Maha Sarakham; Prachuap Khiri Khan
Group 4	Chachoengsao; Chonburi; Nakhon Sawan; Nong Khai; Nonthaburi; Saraburi; Sisaket
Group 5	Kalasin; Pathum Thani; Phang Nga; Phitsanulok; Surin; Trang; Trat
Group 6	Chiang Rai; Kamphaeng Phet; Nakhon Si Thammarat; Pattani; Phichit; Sa Kaeo; Samut Songkhram
Group 7	Amnat Charoen; Chiang Mai; Krabi; Phatthalung; Songkhla; Sukhothai; Tak
Group 8	Chaiyaphum; Lamphun; Nakhon Ratchasima; Nan; Nong Bua Lamphu; Ubon Ratchathani; Uttaradit
Group 9	Chanthaburi; Chumphon; Loei; Nakhon Nayok; Phetchaburi; Satun; Udon Thani
Group 10	Lopburi; Phayao; Phetchabun; Prachinburi; Surat Thani; Uthai Thani; Yala
Group 11	Buriram; Lampang; Mae Hong Son; Mukdahan; Nakhon Pathom; Narathiwat; Samut Prakan

== Results ==
=== Placements ===
Color Keys

- The contestant Won in an International pageant.
- The contestant was a Runner-up in an International pageant.
- The contestant was a Semi-Finalist in an International pageant.

Placement	Contestant	International placement
Miss Grand Thailand 2020	Ranong – Patcharaporn Chantarapadit π	Top 10 — Miss Grand International 2020; Best in National Costume
1st Runner-Up	Pathum Thani – Indy Johnson	Unplaced — Miss Grand International 2021; Best in Evening Gown
2nd Runner-Up	Nakhon Si Thammarat – Patchaploy Rueandaluang	1st Runner-Up — Miss Tourism International 2020
3rd Runner-Up	Chiang Rai – Juthamas Mekseree	Top 10 — Miss Eco International 2021; Miss Eco Top Model; 1st Runner-Up — Best in Resort Wear; 2nd Runner-Up — Best in National Costume
3rd Runner-Up	Chiang Rai – Juthamas Mekseree	Unplaced — Miss Tourism International 2021
4th Runner-Up	Mukdahan – Nutnicha Srithongsuk	Top 10 — Miss Chinese World 2021 Miss Dreven Capital Congeniality
4th Runner-Up	Mukdahan – Nutnicha Srithongsuk	Top 20 — Miss Intercontinental 2021
Top 10	Bangkok – Suphatra Kliangprom; Pattani – Naphatlada Dokphuang ‡; Phra Nakhon Si Ayutthaya' – Aitsari Rodwises §; Ubon Ratchathani – Chutiya Chearakul; Uttaradit – Sisawan Sukeewat	
Top 20	Chai Nat – Jenjira Chanta; Chaiyaphum – Charinee Kudpho; Chiang Mai – Panida Kernjinda; Chonburi – Wanida Dokkularb; Nakhon Phanom – Nantawan Pongpitak; Nan – Warunchana Radomlek; Phitsanulok – Ying Sukanthachan Kao; Phuket – Auranunpas Intarungsee; Songkhla – Unchaya Petchmanee; Suphanburi – Suprang Mun Lee; Udon Thani – Supunnikar Jumrerncha	

§ — Voted into the Top 10 by viewers

‡ — Voted into the Top 10 via Boss Choice

π — Voted into the Top 5 via Boss Choice

== Miss Grand Thailand 2021 ==
=== Miss Grand Thailand ===
The Miss Grand Thailand 2021 was appointed by the organization who will represent Thailand at Miss Grand International 2021.

Placement	Contestant	International placement
Miss Grand Thailand 2021	Pathum Thani – Indy Johnson	Unplaced – Miss Grand International 2021

== Special Awards and Sub-contests ==
=== Special awards ===
Award	Contestant
Miss Grand Rising Star	Nakhon Si Thammarat - Patchaploy Rueangdaluang
Miss Popular Vote	Phra Nakhon Si Ayutthaya - Aitsari Rodwises
Miss Photogenic	Nakhon Si Thammarat - Patchaploy Rueangdaluang
Best in Swimsuit	Suphanburi - Suprang Mun Lee
Best in Evening Gown	Chonburi – Wanida Dokmai
Best National Costume	Ratchaburi - Tiiya Kitiya
Darling of the Host	Nakhon Si Thammarat - Patchaploy Rueangdaluang
Global Beauty Choice	Ranong - Patcharaporn Chantarapadit

=== Miss Grand Rising Star Contest ===
The Miss Grand Rising Star contest was held at the Novotel Suvarnabhumi Airport Hotel on September 4, 2020. Finalists were selected based on various personality criteria through self-introduction. in the first round Then selected by role-playing and answering questions from the judges in round 2 and round 3 by selecting 25, 10 and 3 finalists in each round, respectively. The winner of the Miss Grand Rising Star contest. The name 2020 will be announced during the final contest of Miss Grand Thailand 2020 on September 19, 2020, and will be signed as an actress under One 31.

Results	Contestants
Miss Grand Rising Star	Nakhon Si Thammarat – Patchaploy Rueandaluang
Top 3	Ubon Ratchathani – Phring Chutiya Chearakul; Udon Thani – Supunnikar Jumrerncha
Top 10	Chachoengsao – Pantira Tippayanont; Chiang Mai – Dinsorsee Kernjinda; Nakhon Phanom – Panida Kernjinda; Ranong – Patcharaporn Chantarapadit; Rayong – Sandy Chananchida; Sakon Nakhon – Takky Paweeporn; Samut Songkhram – Parichart Buahem
Top 25	Chaiyaphum – Charinee Kudpho; Kalasin – Aoyphat Suda Konya; Kanchanaburi – Natrawee Chaiarasathid; Nakhon Ratchasima – Jang Papassara; Nong Bua Lamphu – Suni Sunicha; Nonthaburi – Jittima Nicharam; Phitsanulok – Ying Sukanthachan Kao; Phra Nakhon Si Ayutthaya – Aitsari Rodwises; Phrae – Saowalak Ruangparnpoon; Phuket – Auranunpas Intarungsee; Saraburi – Kanokporn Fah; Singburi – Mednoon Warangsiri; Songkhla – Unchaya Petchmanee; Surat Thani – Similan Hemthanont; Yala – Achara Promsana

=== Darling of the Host ===
The Darling of the Host Contest was held on 8 September 2020 at the Utopia Conference Room, Le Méridien Chiang Rai Resort. The winner received a crown (The Artist's Crown) worth 500,000 baht and a cash prize of 50,000 baht. The 1st runner-up and the 2nd runner-up received a cash prize of 30,000 and 10,000 baht, respectively.

Results	Contestants
Darling of the Host	Nakhon Si Thammarat – Patchaploy Rueandaluang
1st Runner-Up	Pathum Thani – Indy Johnson
2nd Runner-Up	Samut Songkhram – Parichart Buahem

=== Best in Swimsuit ===
The Best in Swimsuit Competition was held on September 9, 2020, at Le Meridien Chiang Rai Resort where the final 22 and 13 finalists were decided by voting through the Miss Grand Thailand page. The winner of the best swimwear was announced in the final round.

Results	Contestants
Best in Swimsuit	Suphanburi – Suprang Mun Lee
Top 5	Nan – Warunchana Radomlek; Pathum Thani – Indy Johnson; Ranong – Patcharaporn Chantarapadit; Uttaradit – Ploy Sisawan Sukeewat
Top 13	Chiang Rai – Juthamas Mekseree; Mae Hong Son – Kanyarat Saisawat; Mukdahan – Nutnicha Srithongsuk; Phuket – Auranunpas Intarungsee; Samut Prakan – Peerada Yodjai; Sisaket – Junthima Saiyot; Songkhla – Unchaya Petchmanee; Ubon Ratchathani – Phring Chutiya Chearakul
Top 22	Bangkok – Warunchana Radomlek; Krabi – Janis Thansorn; Kanchanaburi – Natrawee Chaiarasathid; Loei – Milk Natnicha; Nakhon Si Thammarat – Patchaploy Rueandaluang; Prachuap Khiri Khan – Kanyarat Theppiban; Satun – Sirilak Siriphoch; Surin – Janjira Meawmeaw; Udon Thani – Supunnikar Jumrernchai

=== Best in National Costume ===
The Best National Costume Competition will be held on September 16, 2020, at Hall 100, Bangkok International Trade and Exhibition Centre, Bangkok. In which the final 20 contestants will be selected from 10 judges, combined with a selection of 10 sets of votes through the page of Miss Grand Thailand, which announced the winners and runners-up in the finals. The best national costume and the runners-up that have been selected was brought to the representatives to wear to participate in the international contest.

Results	Contestants
Best National Costume	Ratchaburi – Tiiya Kitiya
Top 5	Khon Kaen – Satang Sasipapha; Maha Sarakham – Cherry Moraya Tonngam; Songkhla – Unchaya Petchmanee; Udon Thani – Supunnikar Jumrerncha
Top 10	Amnat Charoen – Thawanlak Tub Ngam; Chanthaburi – Manthaga Wongkham; Nakhon Nayok – Lalita Singsakul; Phra Nakhon Si Ayutthaya – Aitsari Rodwises; Trat – Kaimook Anusara
Top 20	Ang Thong – Phromphon Thongon; Chachoengsao – Pantira Tippayanont; Chiang Rai – Juthamas Mekseree; Chonburi – Wanida Dokmai; Nakhon Ratchasima – Jang Papassara; Nakhon Si Thammarat – Patchaploy Rueandaluang; Pathum Thani – Indy Johnson; Samut Songkhram – Parichart Buahem; Surin – Janjira Meawmeaw; Yasothon – Breeze Rinlapat

=== Best in Evening Gown Contest ===
The Best in Evening Gown Contest was judged by the evening dress used in the preliminary round held on September 17, 2020, at Hall 100, Bangkok International Trade and Exhibition Centre in which the final 20 contestants will be selected from the vote through the Miss Grand Thailand page. The winner of the best evening gown and runner-up was announced in the finals.

Results	Contestants
Best in Evening Gown	Chonburi – Wanida Dokmai
Top 3	Bangkok – Marima Suphatra Kliangprom; Surin – Janjira Meawmeaw
Top 10	Chai Nat – Jenjira Chanta; Chumphon – Paonrat Pinmuang; Pathum Thani – Indy Johnson; Phayao – Thanarat Yangklan; Phrae – Saowalak Ruangparnpoon; Prachuap Khiri Khan – Kanyarat Theppiban; Sisaket – Junthima Saiyot
Top 20	Chanthaburi – Manthaga Wongkham; Kalasin – Aoyphat Suda Konya; Khon Kaen – Satang Sasipapha; Lopburi – Sawitree Fonthong; Nakhon Pathom – Aunyaphat Pitiprachakvatch; Nakhon Si Thammarat – Patchaploy Rueandaluang; Ranong – Patcharaporn Chantarapadit; Sakon Nakhon – Takky Paweeporn; Samut Songkhram – Parichart Buahem; Udon Thani – Supunnikar Jumrernchai

=== People's Choice ===
Results	Contestants
Miss People's Choice	Phra Nakhon Si Ayutthaya - Aitsari Rodwises
Top 13	Chachoengsao – Pantira Tippayanont; Kalasin – Aoyphat Suda Konya; Khon Kaen – Satang Sasipapha; Loei – Milk Natnicha; Maha Sarakham – Cherry Moraya Tonngam; Nong Bua Lamphu – Suni Sunicha; Songkhla – Unchaya Petchmanee; Suphanburi – Suprang Mun Lee; Surin – Janjira Meawmeaw; Trang – Kaofang Yasumin Phassaweephongsakorn; Ubon Ratchathani – Phring Chutiya Chearakul; Udon Thani – Supunnikar Jumrernchai

=== Best Provincial Director ===
The Best Provincial Director was judged by them judging from the best of the competition, such as public relations for the contest, contest stage productions having missions in the province for beauty contestants, etc. The results were announced in the judging round on 19 September 2020.

Results	Contestants
Best National Director	Bangkok – Sarunphat Srisawat
Top 5	Khon Kaen – Thanat Harintachinda; Phuket – Teerasak Pholngam; Songkhla – Pawarit Hayiama; Udon Thani – Yuranan Chanthaya

== Candidates ==
=== Northern group ===
Province	Candidate	Age	Height
Chiang Mai	Dinsorsee Kernjinda	23	1.68 m (5 ft 6 in)
Chiang Rai	Juthamas Mekseree	25	1.72 m (5 ft 7 1/2 in)
Kamphaeng Phet	Venus Pannipa	25	1.76 m (5 ft 9 1/2 in)
Lampang	Sakaoduan Imcha	21	1.75 m (5 ft 9 in)
Lamphun	Phatramon Yimthanom	24	1.70 m (5 ft 7 in)
Mae Hong Son	Kanyarat Saisawat	19	1.69 m (5 ft 6 1/2 in)
Nakhon Sawan	Nuttawan Matchimwong	24	1.73 m (5 ft 8 in)
Nan	Warunchana Radomlek	24	1.75 m (5 ft 9 in)
Phayao	Thanarat Yangklan	22	1.73 m (5 ft 8 in)
Phetchabun	Suthida Ninpai	24	1.74 m (5 ft 8 1/2 in)
Phichit	Tungoh Wilawan	22	1.76 m (5 ft 9 1/2 in)
Phitsanulok	Ying Sukanthachan Kao	24	1.71 m (5 ft 7 1/2 in)
Phrae	Saowalak Ruangparnpoon	21	1.76 m (5 ft 9 1/2 in)
Sukhothai	Suni Sunicha	25	1.73 m (5 ft 8 in)
Tak	Panida Sakhakham	24	1.73 m (5 ft 8 in)
Uthai Thani	Thipsuda Plienbomart	27	1.70 m (5 ft 7 in)
Uttaradit	Ploy Sisawan Sukeewat	24	1.75 m (5 ft 9 in)

=== Central group ===
Province	Candidate	Age	Height
Ang Thong	Phromphon Thongon	23	1.70 m (5 ft 7 in)
(Phra Nakhon Si Ayutthaya province) Ayutthaya	Aitsari Rodwise	22	1.73 m (5 ft 8 in)
Bangkok	Marima Suphatra Kliangprom	21	1.70 m (5 ft 7 in)
Chachoengsao	Pantira Tippayanont	26	1.68 m (5 ft 6 in)
Chai Nat	Jenjira Chanta	22	1.70 m (5 ft 7 in)
Chanthaburi	Manthaga Wongkham	27	1.68 m (5 ft 6 in)
Chonburi	Wanida Dokmai	24	1.70 m (5 ft 7 in)
Lopburi	Sawitree Fonthong	20	1.72 m (5 ft 7 1/2 in)
Nakhon Nayok	Lalita Singsakul	22	1.70 m (5 ft 7 in)
Nakhon Pathom	Aunyaphat Pitiprachakvatch	20	1.69 m (5 ft 6 1/2 in)
Nonthaburi	Jittima Nicharam	21	1.68 m (5 ft 6 in)
Pathum Thani	Indy Johnson	23	1.75 m (5 ft 9 in)
Prachinburi	Nada Panrat Noppakorn	23	1.70 m (5 ft 7 in)
Rayong	Sandy Chananchida	24	1.68 m (5 ft 6 in)
Samut Prakan	Peerada Yodjai	22	1.75 m (5 ft 9 in)
Samut Sakhon	Pornchanok Srikaeo	24	1.70 m (5 ft 7 in)
Samut Songkhram	Parichart Buahem	26	1.68 m (5 ft 6 in)
Saraburi	Kanokporn Fah	21	1.73 m (5 ft 8 in)
Sa Kaeo	Chonthicha Phosri	23	1.70 m (5 ft 7 in)
Singburi	Mednoon Warangsiri	21	1.73 m (5 ft 8 in)
Suphanburi	Suprang Mun Lee	24	1.72 m (5 ft 7 1/2 in)
Trat	Kaimook Anusara	24	1.70 m (5 ft 7 in)

=== Northeastern (Isan) group ===
Province	Candidate	Age	Height
Amnat Charoen	Thawanlak Tub Ngam	23	1.70 m (5 ft 7 in)
Bueng Kan	Suwatcharaporn Jeenkam	22	1.73 m (5 ft 8 in)
Buriram	Nattida Pungnum	25	1.70 m (5 ft 7 in)
Chaiyaphum	Charinee Kudpho	24	1.78 m (5 ft 10 in)
Kalasin	Aoyphat Suda Konya	25	1.72 m (5 ft 7 1/2 in)
Khon Kaen	Satang Sasipapha	21	1.73 m (5 ft 8 in)
Loei	Milk Natnicha	20	1.70 m (5 ft 7 in)
Maha Sarakham	Cherry Moraya Tonngam	26	1.71 m (5 ft 7 1/2 in)
Mukdahan	Nutnicha Srithongsuk	23	1.67 m (5 ft 5 1/2 in)
Nakhon Phanom	Pairpear Pongpitak	23	1.73 m (5 ft 8 in)
Nakhon Ratchasima	Jang Papassara	20	1.72 m (5 ft 7 1/2 in)
Nong Bua Lamphu	Suni Sunicha	25	1.73 m (5 ft 8 in)
Nong Khai	Agie Kesarananthong	20	1.75 m (5 ft 9 in)
Roi Et	Athita Payak	25	1.75 m (5 ft 9 in)
Sakon Nakhon	Takky Paweeporn	24	1.69 m (5 ft 6 1/2 in)
Sisaket	Junthima Saiyot	21	1.79 m (5 ft 10 1/2 in)
Surin	Janjira Meawmeaw	21	1.75 m (5 ft 9 in)
Ubon Ratchathani	Phring Chutiya Chearakul	20	1.73 m (5 ft 8 in)
Udon Thani	Supunnikar Jumrernchai	20	1.73 m (5 ft 8 in)
Yasothon	Breeze Rinlapat	24	1.73 m (5 ft 8 in)

=== Southern group ===
Province	Candidate	Age	Height
Chumphon	Pa-ornrat Pinmueang	20	1.73 m (5 ft 8 in)
Kanchanaburi	Natrawee Chaiarasathid	20	1.70 m (5 ft 7 in)
Krabi	Janis Thansorn	25	1.70 m (5 ft 7 in)
Nakhon Si Thammarat	Patchaploy Rueandaluang	25	1.70 m (5 ft 7 in)
Narathiwat	Rosukon Chanya	21	1.79 m (5 ft 10 1/2 in)
Pattani	Naphatlada Dokphuang	27	1.75 m (5 ft 9 in)
Phang Nga	Sasitorn Kasikun	22	1.70 m (5 ft 7 in)
Phatthalung	Sunisa Iamsamang	24	1.70 m (5 ft 7 in)
Phetchaburi	Miew Natthinon Ahingsaro	23	1.70 m (5 ft 7 in)
Phuket	Auranunpas Intarungsee	22	1.80 m (5 ft 11 in)
Prachuap Khiri Khan	Kanyarat Theppiban	26	1.73 m (5 ft 8 in)
Ranong	Patcharaporn Chantarapadit	22	1.70 m (5 ft 7 in)
Ratchaburi	Tiiya Kitiya	27	1.75 m (5 ft 9 in)
Satun	Sirilak Siriphoch	21	1.72 m (5 ft 7 1/2 in)
Songkhla	Unchaya Petchmanee	24	1.73 m (5 ft 8 in)
Surat Thani	Similan Hemthanont	21	1.73 m (5 ft 8 in)
Trang	Kaofang Yasumin Phassaweephongsakorn	27	1.70 m (5 ft 7 in)
Yala	Achara Promsana	23	1.74 m (5 ft 8 1/2 in)
