= Miss Grand Thailand 2023 =

10th Miss Grand Thailand competition, beauty pageant edition

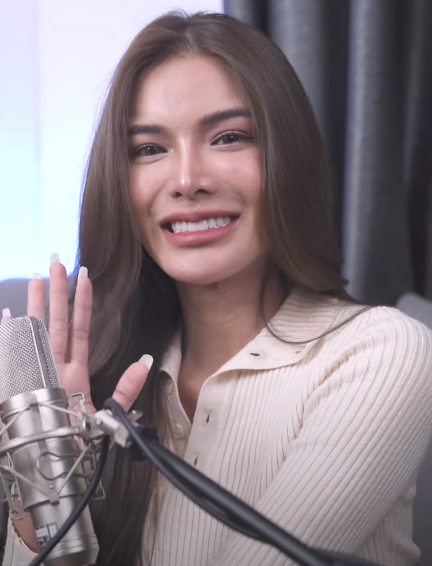
- Thaweeporn Phingchamrat, Miss Grand Thailand 2023
- Date: 29 April 2023
- Presenters: Matthew Deane
- Venue: MGI Hall, Show DC Megacomplex, Bangkok
- Broadcaster: YouTube
- Entrants: 77
- Placements: 20
- Winner: Thaweeporn Phingchamrat; Chumphon
- Best National Costume: Pimjira Jaroenlak; Bangkok
- Photogenic: Ajcharee Srisuk; Loei
- Best in Swimsuit: Pimjira Jaroenlak; Bangkok

Miss Grand Thailand 2023 (Thai: มิสแกรนด์ไทยแลนด์ 2023) was the 10th edition of the Miss Grand Thailand pageant, held at Show DC Hall in Bangkok on 29 April 2023, while the initial pageant activities was decided to be done in the province of Chiang Mai. Engfa Waraha of Bangkok crowned Thaweeporn Phingchamrat of Chumphon at the end of the event. She represented Thailand at Miss Grand International 2023 in Vietnam on 25 October 2023 and placed 5th Runner-Up.

== Background ==
=== Location and date ===
During the live streaming on the personal Facebook page on 6 May 2022, Nawat Itsaragrisil, the president of Miss Grand International, stated that the grand final of 2023 Miss Grand Thailand is scheduled to happen on 29 April 2023 at Show DC Hall, the delegates for such an edition will also be selected through the provincial pageants as accomplished in previous editions. In addition to an online Thai government lottery dealer company, VR Online Innovation, which has been served as the main title sponsorship since 2022, the cosmeceutical brand "Devonte" was also certificated as the premier patronage organ for this edition.

List of the main events in the Miss Grand Thailand 2023 pageant
Date	Event	Venue	Ref.
17 March	Special Forum: Miss Grand and the future of Thailand politics	MGI Hall, Huai Khwang, Bangkok	
6 April	Press conference and welcome ceremony	MGI Hall, Huai Khwang, Bangkok	
14 April	Lan Na Costume competition	Chiang Mai International Exhibition and Convention Centre, Chiang Mai	
16 April	Swimsuit competition	Chiang Mai International Exhibition and Convention Centre, Chiang Mai	
18 April	Miss Darling of Chiang Mai contest	Chiang Mai International Exhibition and Convention Centre, Chiang Mai	
23 April	National Costume Parade	MGI Hall, Huai Khwang, Bangkok	
25 April	Miss Grand Morlam final round	MGI Hall, Huai Khwang, Bangkok	
26 April	Preliminary competition	MGI Hall, Huai Khwang, Bangkok	
29 April	Grand Final Coronation	MGI Hall, Huai Khwang, Bangkok	

== Selection of contestants ==
=== Overview ===
The national finalists for Miss Grand Thailand 2023 were chosen through the provincial pageants held by the different provincial licensees, who in some cases are responsible for more than one province, e.g., Piriya Siannok, who holds the licenses for Amnat Charoen, Chai Nat, Chumphon, Nan, Nong Bua Lamphu, Prachinburi, and Trang.

As announced on the grand final stage of the previous edition, former runners-up of Miss Grand Thailand are permitted to re-participate in the contest, nevertheless, the organizer's president later proclaimed on his personal social media that the pageant candidates with a history of participating in any right-wing pageants, such as Miss Universe Thailand and Miss Thailand, will have been prohibited to acquired any placements or special awards in Miss Grand Thailand pageant, beginning in 2023.

Of all participating candidates, the representative of Chonburi province, Ratrapee Thamjalkul, was appointed as the replacement for the original winner, Kritsadaporn Nakrai, who was dethroned by the provincial licensee for not being able to fulfill the duties. The provincial licensee claimed several reasons for such dethronement; Nakrai, however, thereupon publicized an argument on her private social media to deny all allegations and claimed that the content previously published by the provincial organizer caused a misunderstanding. She then participated at another provincial preliminary pageant, Miss Grand Mukdahan 2023, but did not win the main title.

=== Provincial preliminary contests ===
Sixty-seven provincial pageants were held in 46 provinces to determine provincial representatives to compete at the national stage; the following is a list of the provinces that held the provincial preliminary contests for Miss Grand Thailand 2023.

List of Miss Grand Thailand 2023 Provincial Pageants (as of 7 October 2026), by the coronation date
Host province	Group	Date & Venue	Entrants	Title(s)	Ref.
Nonthaburi	Central	Event 1: 10 September 2022 at MCC Hall, The Mall Lifestore Ngamwongwan	39	1 title: Miss Grand Saraburi	
Nonthaburi	Central	Event 2: 10 November 2022 at Central Chaengwattana, Pak Kret	20	1 title: Miss Grand Nakhon Phathom	
Nonthaburi	Northeastern	Event 3: 21 September 2022 at MCC Hall, The Mall Lifestore Ngamwongwan	20	2 titles: Miss Grand Amnat Charoen; Miss Grand Nong Bua Lamphu	
Nonthaburi	Central	Event 4: 15 October 2022 at Grand Richmond Hotel, Nonthaburi	16	1 title: Miss Grand Nonthaburi	
Nonthaburi	Central	Event 5: 20 December 2022 at Central Chaengwattana, Pak Kret	16	1 title: Miss Grand Suphanburi	
Nonthaburi	Central	Event 6: 26 January 2023 at the La Novia Studio, Pak Kret	14	1 title: Miss Grand Singburi	
Nonthaburi	Central	Event 7: 28 February 2023 at Central Chaengwattana, Pak Kret		1 title: Miss Grand Pathum Thani	
Bangkok	Central	Event 1: 11 September 2022 at TVT Green Park Studio, Saphan Sung	20	1 title: Miss Grand Bangkok	
Bangkok	Northern	Event 2: 7 December 2022 at Show DC Hall, Huai Khwang	18	2 titles: Miss Grand Lampang; Miss Grand Lamphun	
Bangkok	Northern	Event 3: 10 December 2022 at MCC Hall, The Mall Bangkapi, Bangkapi	10	1 title: Miss Grand Phayao	
Bangkok	Southern	Event 4: 27 December 2022 at Show DC Hall, Huai Khwang	16	2 titles: Miss Grand Chumphon; Miss Grand Trang	
Bangkok	Central	Event 5: 8 January 2023 at Mirinn Theatre, Royal City Avenue, Huai Khwang	15	1 title: Miss Grand Samut Sakhon	
Bangkok	Central	Event 6: 28 January 2023 at the Golden Dome Cabaret Show, Huai Khwang	12	1 title: Miss Grand Nakhon Nayok	
Bangkok	Central	Event 7: 29 January 2023 at the Mercury Cabaret Hall, Suan Luang	10	1 title: Miss Grand Sa Kaeo	
Bangkok	Southern	Event 8: 20 February 2023 at the KBank Siam Pic-Ganesha Theater, Pathum Wan	10	3 titles: Miss Grand Phang Nga; Miss Grand Phatthalung; Miss Grand Satun	
Bangkok	Northern	Event 9: 26 February 2023 at 747 Cafe, Lat Krabang		1 title: Miss Grand Phetchabun	
Nakhon Phanom	Northeastern	25 September 2022 at Mekong Heritage Hotel Nakhonphanom	12	1 title: Miss Grand Nakhon Phanom	
Chanthaburi	Central	1 October 2022 at Central Chanthaburi, Chanthaburi	12	1 title: Miss Grand Chanthaburi	
Sukhothai	Northern	3 October 2022 at Sukhothai Porncharoen Resort & Spa, Kong Krailat	10	1 title: Miss Grand Sukhothai	
Khon Kaen	Northeastern	Event 1: 9 October 2022 at Central Plaza Khon Kaen, Khon Kaen	17	1 title: Miss Grand Khon Kaen	
Khon Kaen	Northeastern	Event 2: 27 February 2023 at Rimrang Open Hall, Rimrang restaurant, Khon Kaen		1 title: Miss Grand Bueng Kan	
Surin	Northeastern	13 November 2022 at Thong Tarin Hotel, Surin	20	1 title: Miss Grand Surin	
Chiang Mai	Northern	Event 1: 17 November 2022 at Central Chiang Mai Airport, Chiang Mai	20	1 title: Miss Grand Chiang Mai	
Chiang Mai	Northern	Event 2: 23 December 2022 at MAYA Lifestyle Shopping Center, Chiang Mai	10	1 title: Miss Grand Phichit	
Chiang Mai	Northern	Event 3: 8 February 2023 at the Dipangkorn Rasmijoti Hall, Chiang Mai Rajabhat University	15	1 title: Miss Grand Kamphaeng Phet	
Chonburi	Central	Event 1: 18 November 2022 at Central Festival Pattaya Beach, Pattaya	11	1 title: Miss Grand Chonburi	
Chonburi	Southern	Event 2: 22 February 2023 at Central Plaza Sri Racha, Si Racha	20	3 titles: Miss Grand Narathiwat; Miss Grand Pattani; Miss Grand Yala	
Chonburi	Northeastern	Event 3: 25 February 2023 at the Colosseum Show, Pattaya	11	1 title: Miss Grand Loei	
Prachinburi	Central	18 November 2022 at Tawa Ravadee Resort, Si Maha Phot	10	2 titles: Miss Grand Chai Nat; Miss Grand Prachinburi	
Udonthani	Northeastern	18 November 2022 at Udonthani International Convention and Exhibition Center	20	1 title: Miss Grand Udonthani	
Kalasin	Northeastern	27 November 2022 at His Majesty the King's 80th Birthday Anniversary Auditorium, Kalasin	10	1 title: Miss Grand Kalasin	
Lopburi	Central	27 November 2022 at Big C Departmentstore, Lopburi	13	1 title: Miss Grand Lopburi	
Phitsanulok	Northern	30 November 2022 at Wangchan Riverview Hotel, Phitsanulok	10	1 title: Miss Grand Phitsanulok	
Trat	Central	11 December 2022 at Trat Provincial Administrative Organization Auditorium, Trat	18	1 title: Miss Grand Trat	
Nakhon Si Thammarat	Southern	16 December 2022 at Grand Fortune Hotel Nakhon Si Thammarat, Nakhon Si Thammarat	13	1 title: Miss Grand Nakhon Si Thammarat	
Nakhon Ratchasima	Northeastern	25 December 2022 at MCC Hall, The Mall Korat, Nakhon Ratchasima	17	2 titles: Miss Grand Nakhon Ratchasima; Miss Grand Buriram	
Nakhon Sawan	Northern	12 January 2023 at the 42C The Chic Hotel, Nakhon Sawan	13	1 title: Miss Grand Nakhon Sawan	
Kanchanaburi	Southern	14 January 2023 at the 60th Anniversary Pavilion Kanchanaburi, Kanchanaburi	8	1 title: Miss Grand Kanchanaburi	
Chiang Rai	Northern	19 January 2023 at the Riverie by Katathani Hotel, Chiang Rai	12	1 title: Miss Grand Chiang Rai	
Sisaket	Northeastern	21 January 2023 at Wee Sommai Gymnasium, Sisaket	22	1 title: Miss Grand Sisaket	
Ayutthaya	Central	22 January 2023 at the Ayutthaya City Park Shopping Center, Ayutthaya	16	1 title: Miss Grand Phra Nakhon Si Ayutthaya	
Phuket	Southern	27 January 2023 at Saphan Hin Gymnasium, Phuket	20	1 title: Miss Grand Phuket	
Chaiyaphum	Northeastern	29 January 2023 at the Charoen Auto Groups Office, Chaiyaphum	16	1 title: Miss Grand Chaiyaphum	
Uttaradit	Northern	29 January 2023 at Friday Hotel, Uttaradit	9	1 title: Miss Grand Uttaradit	
Maha Sarakham	Northeastern	3 February 2023 at the Taksila Hotel, Maha Sarakham	11	1 title: Miss Grand Maha Sarakham	
Chachoengsao	Central	5 February 2023 at the Suntara Wellness Resort & Hotel, Chachoengsao	15	1 title: Miss Grand Chachoengsao	
Pathum Thani	Northern	Event 1: 7 February 2023 at the Alive Park Hall, Future Park & Zpell Shopping Center, Rangsit	11	1 title: Miss Grand Phrae	
Pathum Thani	Northern	Event 2: 28 February 2023 at the ESC Park Hotel, Rangsit	10	1 title: Miss Grand Nan	
Songkhla	Southern	12 February 2023 at the Hat Yai Hall, Central Festival Hatyai, Hat Yai	18	1 title: Miss Grand Songkhla	
Nong Khai	Northeastern	14 February 2023 at the Lamduan Temple's Cultural ground, Nong Khai	12	1 title: Miss Grand Nong Khai	
Ratchaburi	Southern	16 February 2023 at Ratchaburi Municipality Gymnasium, Ratchaburi	20	1 title: Miss Grand Ratchaburi	
Mae Hong Son	Northern	18 February 2023 at the Imperial Thara Mae Hong Son Resort, Mae Hong Son	8	1 title: Miss Grand Mae Hong Son	
Samut Prakan	Central	18 February 2023 at the Divalux Resort & Spa, Bang Sao Thong	14	1 title: Miss Grand Samut Prakan	
Tak	Northern	18 February 2023 at Robinson Lifestyle Department Store, Mae Sot	9	1 title: Miss Grand Tak	
Ubon Ratchathani	Northeastern	19 February 2023 at Ubon Culture Exhibition Hall, Arts and Cultures Center in Honor of The Golden Jubilee of His Majesty's Reign, Ubon Ratchathani	13	1 title: Miss Grand Ubon Ratchathani	
Roi Et	Northeastern	20 February 2023 at Petcharat Garden Hotel, Roi Et	14	1 title: Miss Grand Roi Et	
Mukdahan	Northeastern	24 February 2023 at Thaiwatsadu Mukdahan, Mukdahan	10	1 title: Miss Grand Mukdahan	
Krabi	Southern	25 February 2023 at Ramada Ao Nang Krabi Hotel, Krabi	6	1 title: Miss Grand Krabi	
Surat Thani	Southern	Event 1: 25 February 2023 at Nipa Garden Hotel, Surat Thani	10	1 title: Miss Grand Surat Thani	
Surat Thani	Southern	Event 2: 27 February 2023 at Bunjongburi Hotel, Surat Thani	10	1 title: Miss Grand Ranong	
Uthai Thani	Northern	25 February 2023 at Avatar Spa Mountain Suites, Ban Rai	7	1 title: Miss Grand Uthai Thani	
Phetchaburi	Southern	26 February 2023 at Chalerm Phrakiat Cultural Hall, Phetchaburi Rajabhat University	10	1 title: Miss Grand Phetchaburi	
Prachuap Khiri Khan	Southern	27 February 2023 at Blúport Department Store, Hua Hin	10	1 title: Miss Grand Prachuap Khiri Khan	
Samut Sakhon	Central	27 February 2023 in Mahachai subdistrict, Samut Sakhon	8	1 title: Miss Grand Samut Songkhram	
Rayong	Central	28 February 2023 at Ploenta Garden and Restaurant, Rayong	15	2 titles: Miss Grand Rayong; Miss Grand Ang Thong	
Sakon Nakhon	Northeastern	28 February 2023 at the Imperial Hotel, Sakon Nakhon		1 title: Miss Grand Sakon Nakhon	
Yasothon	Northeastern	28 February 2023 at Rak Phayom Hall, Yasothon Technical College, Yasothon	9	1 title: Miss Grand Yasothon	

== Results ==
Color keys

- The contestant Won in an International pageant.
- The contestant was a Runner-up in an International pageant.
- The contestant was a Semi-Finalist in an International pageant.
- Unplaced

=== Placements ===
Placement	Contestant	International placement
Miss Grand Thailand 2023	Chumphon – Thaweeporn Phingchamrat^{[π]}	5th Runner-Up – Miss Grand International 2023
1st Runner-Up	Phuket – Tia Li Taveepanichpan	Winner – Miss Tourism International 2023
2nd Runner-Up	Bangkok – Pimjira Jaroenlak	Top 15 – The Miss Globe 2023
3rd Runner-Up	Loei – Ajcharee Srisuk^{[∆]}	
4th Runner-Up	Phrae – Ketwalee Phobdee	Winner – Miss Aura International 2023
5th Runners-Up	Chiang Rai – Pattaravadee Boonmesup; Lopburi – Tantawan Jitteelak^{[§]}; Nakhon Phanom – Kamonwarai Prajakrattanakul; Nakhon Ratchasima – Rina Chatamanchai^{[‡]}	
5th Runners-Up	Nong Bua Lamphu – Kodchakorn Kontrakoon	Top 20 – Miss Eco International 2024
5th Runners-Up	Saraburi – Vanessa Nattacha Wenk	
Top 20	Kalasin – Praifah Thongrae; Krabi – Pacharada Fusuamakawa; Lampang – Manika Thippanet; Mae Hong Son – Chonticha Kaewbutdee; Nakhon Pathom – Wichayanard Narad; Nakhon Si Thammarat – Supaporn Naksuwan; Pathum Thani – Sophie Siriyakorn Trau; Phetchabun – Worawalan Phutklang; Songkhla – Karnruethai Tassabut	

Note

^∆ Automatically qualified for the Top 11 finalists after winning the fast track "Miss Popular vote".
^§ Automatically qualified for the Top 11 finalists after winning the fast track "Best Seller".
^‡ Automatically qualified for the Top 11 finalists after winning the "Boss Choice" award.
^π Automatically qualified for the Top 5 finalists after winning the "Boss Choice" award.

=== Appointments ===
Title	Contestant	International Placement
Silk Road Miss Tourism of the Globe Thailand 2024	Udon Thani – Patcharida Ngonking	Top 10 – Silk Road Miss Tourism of the Globe 2024

=== Supplementary titles ===
Title		Candidate	Awards	
Title		Candidate	Cash prize	Others
Miss Darling of Chiang Mai		Lamphun – Chayathanus Saradatta	≈ 1,500 USD	
Miss Grand Rising Star		Loei - Ajcharee Srisuk; Lopburi - Tantawan Jitteelak; Sisaket - Koollanat Hongsrimuang	≈ 1,500 USD	One year contract with Rabieb Wathasilp Morlam Band
Miss Grand Model		Mae Hong Son - Chonticha Kaewbutdee; Nakhon Pathom - Wichayanard Narad; Lampang - Manika Thippanet; Udon Thani - Patcharida Ngonking; Surin - Khanaporn Phatthanaphan	≈ 600 USD	Six months modeling contract with the MGI PLC
Miss Photogenic		Loei - Ajcharee Srisuk	≈ 1,500 USD	
Miss Popular Vote		Loei - Ajcharee Srisuk	≈ 1,500 USD	One year contract with the MGI PLC
Best in Swimsuit		Bangkok - Pimjira Jaroenlak	≈ 3,000 USD	
Best Seller		Lopburi - Tantawan Jitteelak		Qualified for the top 11 finalists automatically.
Best Introduction		Krabi - Pacharada Fusuamakawa	≈ 1,500 USD	
Best Lanna Costume		Songkhla - Karnruethai Tassabut	≈ 1,000 USD	
Best Designer	Winner	Pattani - Chanyathida Matiyapak	≈ 3,000 USD	
Best Designer	Runners-up	Amnat Charoen - Juthamas Mekseree; Nakhon Pathom - Wichayanard Narad	≈ 600 USD	
Best National Costumes	Winner	Bangkok - Pimjira Jaroenlak	≈ 3,000 USD	
Best National Costumes	Runners-up	Amnat Charoen - Juthamas Mekseree; Nakhon Si Thammarat - Supaporn Naksuwan; Sisaket - Koollanat Hongsrimuang; Songkhla - Karnruethai Tassabut; Ranong - Yanisa Sutthinun; Buriram - Kanyaphak Saengkaew; Satun - Ployphailin Worawong; Samut Sakhon - Anunya Pamonbout; Loei - Ajcharee Srisuk	≈ 900 USD	

=== Sponsor awards ===
Title	Candidate	Awards	
Title	Candidate	Cash prize	Others
WOW Award	Phuket – Tia Li Taveepanichpan	≈ 15,000 USD	
Best Promoter	Phuket – Tia Li Taveepanichpan	≈ 1,500 USD	
Miss Bearbeary's Choice	Nakhon Phanom - Kamonwarai Prajakrattanakul	≈ 300 USD	
Best Fashion Looks	Nakhon Phanom - Kamonwarai Prajakrattanakul	—N/a	Free flight tickets worth US$8,800
Miss Angelic Face	Chumphon - Thaweeporn Phingchamrat	≈ US$3,000	Gift voucher worth US$3,000
Confidence Girl	Lopburi - Tantawan Jitteelak	≈ 300 USD	
Charming Girl	Phuket – Tia Li Taveepanichpan	≈ 300 USD	
Shining Girl	Chumphon - Thaweeporn Phingchamrat	≈ 3,000 USD	
Miss Citra	Chumphon - Thaweeporn Phingchamrat	≈ 3,000 USD	
Miss Aura Skin	Nakhon Ratchasima - Rina Chatamanchai	≈ 1,500 USD	
Miss Perfect Skin	Bangkok - Pimjira Charoenluk	≈ 3,000 USD	
Miss Charming By Chat	Phuket – Tia Li Taveepanichpan	≈ 3,000 USD	
Rosie' Master Clinic Style	Lampang - Manika Thippanet	≈ 1,500 USD	
Lolane Hair Charming Queen	Phuket – Tia Li Taveepanichpan	≈ 1,500 USD	
Smart Queen by Regen Smart City	Amnat Charoen - Juthamas Mekseree	≈ US$1,500	

== Pageant ==
=== Challenging activities ===
The following list is the challenges of the Miss Grand Thailand 2023 pageant held by the organizer or pageant sponsors to select the winner or qualified candidates to join the specific events.

Challenge	Administrator	Method and awards	Qualified contestants	Ref.
Pre-arrival voting	Miss Grand International PLC.	Ten contestants with the highest voting score calculated based on the number of likes and shares on the organizer's Facebook page together with the number of likes and viewers of their video clip posted on the organizer's TikTok page gained the right to join a special dinner with the president of the contest, Nawat Itsaragrisil, on April 3.	Chumphon; Chiang Mai; Kanchanaburi; Loei; Lopburi; Nakhon Phanom; Nong Bua Lamphu; Phetchabun; Phrae; Phuket	
Best Seller	Miss Grand International PLC.	Contestants with sales of MGI PLC products over 700,000 baht (approx. US$20,000) on TikTok platforms gained the right to participate in a special trip to Vietnam as well as being special guests at the press conference of the Miss Grand Vietnam 2023 contest.	Lamphun; Loei; Lopburi; Nakhon Phanom; Nong Bua Lamphu; Phichit; Phuket; Saraburi	
Best Promoter	Wink White Panacea Co., Ltd.	The contestant with the best salesmanship in selling the company's products will receive a prize of 50,000 baht (approx. US$1,500), while the remaining nine qualified contestants received a special gift set from the company. Moreover, one contestant with the best product review on social media platforms, such as TikTok and Instagram, will receive a cash prize of 100,000 baht (approx. US$3,000) as a reward.	Workshop winner: Phuket; Online winner: TBA; Other qualifiers: Amnat Charoen; Krabi; Nakhon Si Thammarat; Nakhon Ratchasima; Nakhon Phanom; Mae Hong Son; Lopburi; Loei; Lamphun	
Miss Citra	Unilever Thai Holdings Co., Ltd.		Winner: Chumphon; Other qualifiers: Chumphon; Chiang Rai; Lamphun; Loei; Nakhon Phanom; Nakhon Ratchasima; Nong Bua Lamphu; Phuket; Rayong; Singburi	

=== Main pageant ===
==== Miss Grand Morlam Rising Star contest ====
External videos
- The audition and the pre-final round of the Miss Grand Morlam Rising Star contest, on April 5, 2022, YouTube video

The Miss Grand Rising Star contest was held in three segments, including the audition round, pre-final, and final rounds, in which the number of participating contestants was narrowed down to 25, 10, and 7, respectively. The audition round was directly judged by the pageant organizer personnel while the remaining rounds were judged by several Mor lam performers from Rabieb Wathasilp Mor lam band (Thai: ระเบียบวาทะศิลป์).

The following are lists of panels of judges of the Miss Grand Morlam Rising Star contest.

- Pre-final round
1. Engfa Waraha – 2022 Miss Grand Morlam Rising Star winner
2. Phakdee Pollam – Rabieb Wathasilp band leader
3. Pongdet Nakham – Rabieb Wathasilp MC
4. Narakorn Kanchantuk – Rabieb Wathasilp main performer
5. Sukanya Lunthaisong – Rabieb Wathasilp main performer
6. Yukhondet Patchim – Rabieb Wathasilp main performer
- Final round
1. TBA
2. TBA
3. TBA

The audition and pre-final rounds were held at the Hotel Swissôtel Bangkok Ratchada, in which the panel of judges selected the finalists based on their Mor Lam-related performances. Meanwhile, the final round of the contest will be later held with the full show of Rabieb Wathasilp Mor Lam Band on April 25 at the MGI Hall in Huai Khwang. The winner of the Miss Grand Morlam Rising Star contest has to sign a contract to work as the Mor lam performer for the aforementioned traditional music band for 1 year.

Sub-contest: Miss Grand Morlam Rising Star competition result

Top 24			Top 10		Top 7		Winners
Ayutthaya; Chiang Rai; Kanchanaburi; Krabi; Lampang; Lamphun; Loei; Lopburi; Mukdahan; Narathiwat; Nong Khai; Nonthaburi	Pathum Thani; Phatthalung; Phayao; Rayong; Roi Et; Satun; Sisaket; Songkhla; Surin; Tak; Trat; Yala	Pre-final round	Krabi; Loei; Lopburi; Nonthaburi; Phatthalung; Roi Et; Sisaket; Surin; Tak; Yala	Pre-final round	Krabi; Loei; Lopburi; Nonthaburi; Sisaket; Surin; Yala	Final round	Loei; Lopburi; Sisaket

Sources:
- ""ณวัฒน์" แท็กทีม "พ่อเอ๊ะ ระเบียบวาทศิลป์" ร่วมคัด "มิสแกรนด์หมอลำไรซิ่งสตาร์2023" เฟ้นหา "นางเอกหมอลำคนใหม่"" (in Thai). MCOT. 6 April 2023.
- "คัดเลือก "มิสแกรนด์หมอลำไรซิ่งสตาร์2023" แบบม่วนๆ" (in Thai). Nation TV. 6 April 2023.
- "Live Miss Grand Thailand 2023 - รอบ หมอลำไรซิ่งสตาร์ 2023". Grand TV. 5 April 2023 – via YouTube.

== Candidates ==
77 contestants competed for the title:

Code	Province	Candidate	Age	Height	Group	Ref
MGT01	Bangkok	Pimjira Jaroenlak	29	1.74 m (5 ft 8 1/2 in)	Central	
MGT02	Krabi	Pacharada Fusuamakawa	28	1.70 m (5 ft 7 in)	Southern	
MGT03	Kanchanaburi	Araya Yuangsua	20	1.72 m (5 ft 7 1/2 in)	Southern	
MGT04	Kalasin	Praifah Tongrae	24	1.75 m (5 ft 9 in)	Northeastern	
MGT05	Kamphaeng Phet	Piyatida Sengluang	25	1.68 m (5 ft 6 in)	Northern	
MGT06	Khon Kaen	Khwanticha Thoruth	25	1.74 m (5 ft 8 1/2 in)	Northeastern	
MGT07	Chanthaburi	Tamita Anusin	26	1.68 m (5 ft 6 in)	Central	
MGT08	Chachoengsao	Pahcharin Malilor	28	1.74 m (5 ft 8 1/2 in)	Central	
MGT09	Chonburi	Ratrapee Thamjalkul (Note: Chonburi – Kritsadaporn Nakrai, the original winner, was dethroned for not being able to fulfill her duties, hence, the second runner-up Ratrapee Thamjalkul was instead promoted to take over the title.)	18	1.72 m (5 ft 7 1/2 in)	Central	
MGT10	Chai Nat	Chonticha Sangkhasa	24	1.75 m (5 ft 9 in)	Central	
MGT11	Chaiyaphum	Sirirat Maneeka	25	1.70 m (5 ft 7 in)	Northeastern	
MGT12	Chumphon	Thaweeporn Phingchamrat	27	1.71 m (5 ft 7 1/2 in)	Southern	
MGT13	Chiang Rai	Pattaravadee Boonmesup	24	1.67 m (5 ft 5 1/2 in)	Northern	
MGT14	Chiang Mai	Sisawan Sukhiwat	27	1.71 m (5 ft 7 1/2 in)	Northern	
MGT15	Trang	Piyathida Phothong	23	1.73 m (5 ft 8 in)	Southern	
MGT16	Trat	Jennifer Gallemaert	20	1.73 m (5 ft 8 in)	Central	
MGT17	Tak	Pratimaporn Teawpleumpitisuk	27	1.73 m (5 ft 8 in)	Northern	
MGT18	Nakhon Nayok	Patcharida Poolsakworasarn	24	1.73 m (5 ft 8 in)	Central	
MGT19	Nakhon Pathom	Wichayanard Narad	22	1.75 m (5 ft 9 in)	Central	
MGT20	Nakhon Phanom	Kamonwarai Prajakrattanakul	23	1.67 m (5 ft 5 1/2 in)	Northeastern	
MGT21	Nakhon Ratchasima	Rina Chatamanchai	24	1.70 m (5 ft 7 in)	Northeastern	
MGT22	Nakhon Si Thammarat	Supaporn Naksuwan	25	1.70 m (5 ft 7 in)	Southern	
MGT23	Nakhon Sawan	Phatsawanan Singthip	20	1.77 m (5 ft 9 1/2 in)	Northern	
MGT24	Nonthaburi	Mootita Longna	25	1.67 m (5 ft 5 1/2 in)	Central	
MGT25	Narathiwat	Thunjira Natiprawat	24	1.80 m (5 ft 11 in)	Southern	
MGT26	Nan	Suphamon Chadadam	27	1.75 m (5 ft 9 in)	Northern	
MGT27	Bueng Kan	Witchuda Jakwiset	22	1.70 m (5 ft 7 in)	Northeastern	
MGT28	Buriram	Kanyaphak Saengkaew	24	1.70 m (5 ft 7 in)	Northeastern	
MGT29	Pathum Thani	Sophie Siriyakorn Trau	19	1.76 m (5 ft 9 1/2 in)	Central	
MGT30	Prachuap Khiri Khan	Chanidapa Booniam	28	1.67 m (5 ft 5 1/2 in)	Southern	
MGT31	Prachinburi	Supissara Sangthong	24	1.73 m (5 ft 8 in)	Central	
MGT32	Pattani	Chanyathida Matiyapak	28	1.67 m (5 ft 5 1/2 in)	Southern	
MGT33	Phra Nakhon Si Ayutthaya	Nunmanat Kraiha	25	1.71 m (5 ft 7 1/2 in)	Central	
MGT34	Phayao	Onrarat Vuenchiew	21	1.70 m (5 ft 7 in)	Northern	
MGT35	Phang Nga	Natkanok Sitthirat	28	1.70 m (5 ft 7 in)	Southern	
MGT36	Phatthalung	Salinthip Sena	23	1.70 m (5 ft 7 in)	Southern	
MGT37	Phichit	Thaphimsiya Kasemwutrat	21	1.70 m (5 ft 7 in)	Northern	
MGT38	Phitsanulok	Kenika Pakinsirikul	23	1.70 m (5 ft 7 in)	Northern	
MGT39	Phetchaburi	Wanda Carry Dahmann	22	1.72 m (5 ft 7 1/2 in)	Southern	
MGT40	Phetchabun	Worawalun Putklang	26	1.70 m (5 ft 7 in)	Northern	
MGT41	Phrae	Ketwalee Phlobdee	18	1.74 m (5 ft 8 1/2 in)	Northern	
MGT42	Phuket	Tia Li Taveepanichpan	26	1.70 m (5 ft 7 in)	Southern	
MGT43	Maha Sarakham	Sumintra Kokat	19	1.72 m (5 ft 7 1/2 in)	Northeastern	
MGT44	Mukdahan	Chonticha Kulsuwan	26	1.72 m (5 ft 7 1/2 in)	Northeastern	
MGT45	Mae Hong Son	Chonticha Kaewbutdee	25	1.80 m (5 ft 11 in)	Northern	
MGT46	Yala	Rungnapa Boonrin	25	1.72 m (5 ft 7 1/2 in)	Southern	
MGT47	Yasothon	Savitree Kanasart	19	1.70 m (5 ft 7 in)	Northeastern	
MGT48	Roi Et	Kanyagorn Naratorn	19	1.70 m (5 ft 7 in)	Northeastern	
MGT49	Ranong	Yanisa Sutthinun	24	1.70 m (5 ft 7 in)	Southern	
MGT50	Rayong	Anuthida Saratana	27	1.70 m (5 ft 7 in)	Central	
MGT51	Ratchaburi	Jutamanee Parasing	27	1.70 m (5 ft 7 in)	Southern	
MGT52	Lopburi	Tantawan Jitteelak	26	1.76 m (5 ft 9 1/2 in)	Central	
MGT53	Lampang	Manika Thippanet	23	1.75 m (5 ft 9 in)	Northern	
MGT54	Lamphun	Chayathanus Saradatta	28	1.80 m (5 ft 11 in)	Northern	
MGT55	Loei	Ajcharee Srisuk	22	1.67 m (5 ft 5 1/2 in)	Northern	
MGT56	Sisaket	Koollanat Hongsrimuang	19	1.75 m (5 ft 9 in)	Northeastern	
MGT57	Sakon Nakhon	Chompunut Nanudon	27	1.73 m (5 ft 8 in)	Northeastern	
MGT58	Songkhla	Karnruethai Tassabut	28	1.70 m (5 ft 7 in)	Southern	
MGT59	Satun	Ployphailin Worawong	24	1.73 m (5 ft 8 in)	Southern	
MGT60	Samut Prakan	Supaporn Yomrak	20	1.75 m (5 ft 9 in)	Central	
MGT61	Samut Songkhram	Kanitta Saeyap	25	1.68 m (5 ft 6 in)	Central	
MGT62	Samut Sakhon	Anunya Pamonbout	27	1.67 m (5 ft 5 1/2 in)	Central	
MGT63	Sa Kaeo	Baralee Ruamrak	23	1.71 m (5 ft 7 1/2 in)	Central	
MGT64	Saraburi	Vanessa Natcha Wenk	19	1.75 m (5 ft 9 in)	Central	
MGT65	Sing Buri	Panyada Klaipothong	24	1.70 m (5 ft 7 in)	Central	
MGT66	Sukhothai	Charatrawee Chuasing	21	1.71 m (5 ft 7 1/2 in)	Northern	
MGT67	Suphanburi	Kanokporn Nuttayothin	25	1.78 m (5 ft 10 in)	Central	
MGT68	Surat Thani	Angelina Skye Walker	20	1.79 m (5 ft 10 1/2 in)	Southern	
MGT69	Surin	Khanaporn Phatthanaphan	22	1.71 m (5 ft 7 1/2 in)	Northeastern	
MGT70	Nong Khai	Butsaba Phiosahwang	19	1.70 m (5 ft 7 in)	Northeastern	
MGT71	Nong Bua Lamphu	Kodchakorn Kontrakoon	22	1.70 m (5 ft 7 in)	Northeastern	
MGT72	Ang Thong	Natthakan Siamaekoo	27	1.72 m (5 ft 7 1/2 in)	Central	
MGT73	Udon Thani	Patcharida Ngonking	26	1.83 m (6 ft 0 in)	Northeastern	
MGT74	Uthai Thani	Khaekhai Norawong	24	1.71 m (5 ft 7 1/2 in)	Northern	
MGT75	Uttaradit	Jessica Chairin	17	1.72 m (5 ft 7 1/2 in)	Northern	
MGT76	Ubon Ratchathani	Phacharanan Jantem	25	1.75 m (5 ft 9 in)	Northeastern	
MGT77	Amnat Charoen	Juthamas Mekseree	28	1.72 m (5 ft 7 1/2 in)	Northeastern	

== Notes ==
Replacements
