= Sam Sung district =

SamSung ซำสูง
- District
- District location in Khon Kaen province
- Coordinates: 16°32′35″N 103°4′47″E
- Country: Thailand
- Province: Khon Kaen
- Seat: Kranuan

Area
  - Total: 116.7 km^{2} (45.1 sq mi)

Population (2005)
  - Total: 23,672
  - Density: 202.8/km^{2} (525/sq mi)
- Time zone: UTC+7 (ICT)
- Postal code: 40170
- Geocode: 4021

Sam Sung (Thai: ซำสูง, pronounced [sām sǔːŋ]; Northeastern Thai: ซำสูง, pronounced [sâm sǔːŋ]) is a district (amphoe) of Khon Kaen province, northeastern Thailand.

== History ==
The minor district (king amphoe) was established on 31 March 1994 by splitting five tambons from Kranuan district. The establishment of the new district became effective on 30 April.

On 15 May 2007, all 81 minor districts were upgraded to full districts. On 24 August, the upgrade became official.

== Geography ==
Neighboring districts are (from the southwest clockwise): Mueang Khon Kaen, Nam Phong, and Kranuan of Khon Kaen Province; Chuen Chom and Chiang Yuen of Maha Sarakham province.

== Administration ==
The district is divided into five subdistricts (tambons), which are further subdivided into 34 villages (mubans). The township (thesaban tambon) Sam Sung (เทศบาลตำบลซำสูง) covers tambon Kranuan. There are a further four tambon administrative organizations (TAO).

No.	Name	Thai name	Villages	Pop.
1.	Kranuan	กระนวน	6	5,188
2.	Kham Maet	คำแมด	5	3,449
3.	Ban Non	บ้านโนน	9	5,877
4.	Khu Kham	คูคำ	7	4,624
5.	Huai Toei	ห้วยเตย	7	4,534
