= Chuen Chom district =

Chuen Chom ชื่นชม
- District
- District location in Maha Sarakham province
- Coordinates: 16°31′53″N 103°10′18″E
- Country: Thailand
- Province: Maha Sarakham
- Seat: Chuen Chom

Area
  - Total: 113.0 km^{2} (43.6 sq mi)

Population (2005)
  - Total: 24,586
  - Density: 217.6/km^{2} (564/sq mi)
- Time zone: UTC+7 (ICT)
- Postal code: 44160
- Geocode: 4413

Chuen Chom (Thai: ชื่นชม, pronounced [tɕʰɯ̂ːn tɕʰōm]; Northeastern Thai: ซื่นซม, pronounced [sɯ̄ːn sôm]) is a district (amphoe) in the north of Maha Sarakham province, northeastern Thailand.

== Geography ==
Neighboring districts are (from the south clockwise): Chiang Yuen of Maha Sarakham Province; Sam Sung and Kranuan of Khon Kaen province; Huai Mek and Yang Talat of Kalasin province.

== History ==
The minor district (king amphoe) was split off from Chiang Yuen district on 1 July 1997.

The Thai government on 15 May 2007 upgraded all 81 minor districts to full districts. With publication in the Royal Gazette on 24 August the upgrade became official.

== Administration ==
The district is divided into four sub-districts (tambons), which are further subdivided into 47 villages (mubans). There are no municipal (thesabans). There are four tambon administrative organizations (TAO).

No.	Name	Thai name	Villages	Pop.
1.	Chuen Chom	ชื่นชม	11	5,886
2.	Kut Pla Duk	กุดปลาดุก	15	8,264
3.	Lao Dok Mai	เหล่าดอกไม้	11	6,329
4.	Nong Kung	หนองกุง	10	4,107
