= Kranuan district =

Kranuan กระนวน
- District
- District location in Khon Kaen province
- Coordinates: 16°42′22″N 103°4′44″E
- Country: Thailand
- Province: Khon Kaen
- Seat: Nong Ko

Area
  - Total: 322.017 km^{2} (124.331 sq mi)

Population (2005)
  - Total: 77,531
  - Density: 240.8/km^{2} (624/sq mi)
- Time zone: UTC+7 (ICT)
- Postal code: 40170
- Geocode: 4009

Kranuan (Thai: กระนวน, pronounced [krā.nūan]; Northeastern Thai: กระนวน, pronounced [kā.nûan]) is a district (amphoe) of Khon Kaen province, northeastern Thailand.

== History ==
The minor district (king amphoe) Kranuan was established on 1 January 1948 by splitting it from Nam Phong district. It was upgraded to a full district on 22 July 1958.

== Geography ==
Neighboring districts are (from the south clockwise): Sam Sung and Nam Phong of Khon Kaen Province; Non Sa-at and Kumphawapi of Udon Thani province; Tha Khantho, Nong Kung Si, and Huai Mek of Kalasin province; and Chuen Chom of Maha Sarakham province.

== Administration ==
The district is divided into nine subdistricts (tambons), which are further subdivided into 81 villages (mubans). Nong Ko is a township (thesaban tambon) which covers parts of tambon Nong Ko. There are a further nine tambon administrative organizations (TAO).

No.	Name	Thai name	Villages	Pop.
1.	Nong Ko	หนองโก	19	21,252
2.	Nong Kung Yai	หนองกุงใหญ่	13	10,315
3.	Huai Chot	ห้วยโจด	11	6,370
4.	Huai Yang	ห้วยยาง	9	6,037
5.	Ban Fang	บ้านฝาง	11	7,831
6.	Dun Sat	ดูนสาด	11	8,038
7.	Nong No	หนองโน	7	6,180
8.	Nam Om	น้ำอ้อม	8	4,763
9.	Hua Na Kham	หัวนาคำ	10	6,745
