= Chiang Yuen district =

Chiang Yuen เชียงยืน
- District
- District location in Maha Sarakham province
- Coordinates: 16°24′29″N 103°6′19″E
- Country: Thailand
- Province: Maha Sarakham
- District established: 1958

Area
  - Total: 289.0 km^{2} (111.6 sq mi)

Population (2008)
  - Total: 61,704
  - Density: 214.5/km^{2} (556/sq mi)
- Time zone: UTC+7 (ICT)
- Postal code: 44160
- Geocode: 4405

Chiang Yuen (Thai: เชียงยืน, pronounced [tɕʰīaŋ jɯ̄ːn]; Northeastern Thai: เซียงยืน, pronounced [si᷇aŋ jɯ̄ːn]) is a district (amphoe) in the northern part of Maha Sarakham province, northeastern Thailand.

== Geography ==
Neighboring districts are (from the north clockwise): Chuen Chom of Maha Sarakham Province; Yang Talat of Kalasin province; Kantharawichai and Kosum Phisai of Maha Sarakham; Mueang Khon Kaen and Sam Sung of Khon Kaen province.

== History ==
On 16 August 1958 the minor district (king amphoe) was split off from Kantharawichai district, consisting of the four tambons Chiang Yuen, Chuen Chom, Ku Thong, and Nong Son. On 11 December 1959 it was upgraded to a full district.

== Administration ==
The district is divided into eight sub-districts (tambons), which are further subdivided into 116 villages (mubans). Chiang Yuen is a sub-district municipality (thesaban tambon) which covers parts of tambon Chiang Yuen. There are a further eight tambon administrative organizations (TAO).

| No. | Name | Thai | Villages | Pop. |
|---|---|---|---|---|
| 1. | Chiang Yuen | เชียงยืน | 19 | 13,758 |
| 3. | Nong Son | หนองซอน | 16 | 6,895 |
| 5. | Don Ngoen | ดอนเงิน | 15 | 7,128 |
| 6. | Ku Thong | กู่ทอง | 19 | 10,155 |
| 7. | Na Thong | นาทอง | 11 | 5,690 |
| 8. | Suea Thao | เสือเฒ่า | 16 | 8,374 |
| 11. | Phon Thong | โพนทอง | 12 | 6,036 |
| 12. | Lao Bua Ban | เหล่าบัวบาน | 8 | 3,668 |

Missing numbers are the tambons which now form Chuen Chom District.
