= Huai Mek district =

District of Thailand

Huai Mek ห้วยเม็ก
- District
- District location in Kalasin province
- Coordinates: 16°35′24″N 103°14′8″E
- Country: Thailand
- Province: Kalasin

Area
  - Total: 291.01 km^{2} (112.36 sq mi)

Population (2005)
  - Total: 49,716
  - Density: 170.8/km^{2} (442/sq mi)
- Time zone: UTC+7 (ICT)
- Postal code: 46240
- Geocode: 4608

Huai Mek (Thai: ห้วยเม็ก, pronounced [hûaj mék]; Northeastern Thai: ห้วยเม็ก, pronounced [hùaj mèk]) is a district (amphoe) in the western part of Kalasin province, northeastern Thailand.

== Geography ==
Neighboring districts are (from the northeast clockwise): Nong Kung Si and Yang Talat of Kalasin Province; Chuen Chom of Maha Sarakham province; and Kranuan of Khon Kaen Province.

== History ==
The minor district (king amphoe) was created on 1 November 1970, when the three tambons, Huai Mek, Kut Don, and Bueng Na Riang were split off from Yang Talat district. It was upgraded to a full district on 12 April 1977.

== Administration ==
The district is divided into nine sub-districts (tambons), which are further subdivided into 81 villages (mubans). There are two townships (thesaban tambons): Huai Mek and Kham Yai each cover parts of the same-named tambon. There are a further nine tambon administrative organizations (TAO).

No.	Name	Thai name	Villages	Pop.
1.	Huai Mek	ห้วยเม็ก	12	9,094
2.	Kham Yai	คำใหญ่	12	7,306
3.	Kut Don	กุดโดน	13	8,369
4.	Bueng Na Riang	บึงนาเรียง	7	3,955
5.	Hua Hin	หัวหิน	8	4,344
6.	Phimun	พิมูล	7	4,149
7.	Kham Mueat Kaeo	คำเหมือดแก้ว	9	5,788
8.	Non Sa-at	โนนสะอาด	7	4,091
9.	Sai Thong	ทรายทอง	6	2,620
