= Borabue district =

Borabue บรบือ
- District
- District location in Maha Sarakham province
- Coordinates: 16°2′18″N 103°7′9″E
- Country: Thailand
- Province: Maha Sarakham
- Seat: Borabue

Area
  - Total: 681.6 km^{2} (263.2 sq mi)

Population (2005)
  - Total: 108,256
  - Density: 158.8/km^{2} (411/sq mi)
- Time zone: UTC+7 (ICT)
- Postal code: 44130
- Geocode: 4406

Borabue (Thai: บรบือ, pronounced [bɔ̄ː.rā.bɯ̄ː]; Northeastern Thai: บรบือ, pronounced [bɔ̀ː.lā.bɯ̀ː]) is a district (amphoe) in the central part of Maha Sarakham province, northeastern Thailand.

== Geography ==
Neighboring districts are (from the north clockwise): Kosum Phisai, Mueang Maha Sarakham, Wapi Pathum, Na Chueak, and Kut Rang.

== History ==
In 1897 the district was established, then named Patchim Sarakham (ปจิมสารคาม). In 1913 it was renamed Thakhon Yang (ท่าขรยาง). In 1914 the governor of Maha Sarakham granted the new name Borabue (at first spelled บ่อระบือ, later shortened to บรบือ).

== Administration ==
The district is divided into 15 sub-districts (tambons), which are further subdivided into 203 villages (mubans). Borabue is a sub-district municipality (thesaban tambon) which covers parts of tambon Borabue. There are a further 15 tambon administrative organizations (TAO).

No.	Name	Thai name	Villages	Pop.
1.	Borabue	บรบือ	16	14,026
2.	Bo Yai	บ่อใหญ่	17	13,275
4.	Wang Chai	วังไชย	10	5,004
5.	Nong Muang	หนองม่วง	13	6,489
6.	Kamphi	กำพี้	15	6,979
7.	Non Rasi	โนนราษี	13	7,299
8.	Non Daeng	โนนแดง	19	11,732
10.	Nong Chik	หนองจิก	20	9,319
11.	Bua Mat	บัวมาศ	9	3,580
13.	Nong Khu Khat	หนองคูขาด	16	6,369
15.	Wang Mai	วังใหม่	10	4,836
16.	Yang	ยาง	15	4,010
18.	Nong Sim	หนองสิม	10	5,521
19.	Nong Ko	หนองโก	10	5,669
20.	Don Ngua	ดอนงัว	10	4,148

Missing numbers are tambons which now form Kut Rang District.
