= Nong Kung Si district =

District of Thailand

Nong Kung Si หนองกุงศรี
- District
- District location in Kalasin province
- Coordinates: 16°39′21″N 103°17′38″E
- Country: Thailand
- Province: Kalasin
- Seat: Nong Kung Si

Area
  - Total: 626.944 km^{2} (242.064 sq mi)

Population (2005)
  - Total: 65,521
  - Density: 104.5/km^{2} (271/sq mi)
- Time zone: UTC+7 (ICT)
- Postal code: 46220
- Geocode: 4612

Nong Kung Si (Thai: หนองกุงศรี, pronounced [nɔ̌ːŋ kūŋ sǐː]; Northeastern Thai: หนองกุงศรี, pronounced [nɔ̌ːŋ kùŋ sǐː]) is a district (amphoe) in the western part of Kalasin province, northeastern Thailand.

== History ==
The government separated Tambon Nong Kung Si and Khok Khruea from Tha Khantho district and created Nong Kung Si minor district (king amphoe) on 14 September 1973. Later Tambon Nong Bua of Sahatsakhan district was assigned to the minor district in 1975. It was upgraded to a full district on 25 March 1979.

== Geography ==
Neighboring districts are (from the northeast clockwise): Sam Chai, Sahatsakhan, Mueang Kalasin, Yang Talat, and Huai Mek of Kalasin Province; Kranuan of Khon Kaen Province; Tha Khantho of Kalasin Province; and Wang Sam Mo of Udon Thani province.

== Administration ==
The district is divided into nine sub-districts (tambons), which are further subdivided into 111 villages (mubans). There are two townships (thesaban tambons): Nong Hin covers parts of tambons Nong Hin and Dong Mun, and Nong Kung Si parts of tambons Lam Nong Saen. There are a further eight tambon administrative organizations (TAO).

No.	Name	Thai name	Villages	Pop.
1.	Nong Kung Si	หนองกุงศรี	13	7,698
2.	Nong Bua	หนองบัว	13	7,048
3.	Khok Khruea	โคกเครือ	15	10,485
4.	Nong Suang	หนองสรวง	11	5,501
5.	Sao Lao	เสาเล้า	14	5,795
6.	Nong Yai	หนองใหญ่	15	8,169
7.	Dong Mun	ดงมูล	13	9,153
8.	Lam Nong Saen	ลำหนองแสน	8	5,794
9.	Nong Hin	หนองหิน	9	5,878
