= Kantharawichai district =

Kantharawichai กันทรวิชัย
- District
- District location in Maha Sarakham province
- Coordinates: 16°19′22″N 103°17′48″E
- Country: Thailand
- Province: Maha Sarakham
- Seat: Khok Phra

Area
  - Total: 372.2 km^{2} (143.7 sq mi)

Population (2005)
  - Total: 80,250
  - Density: 215.6/km^{2} (558/sq mi)
- Time zone: UTC+7 (ICT)
- Postal code: 44150
- Geocode: 4404

Kantharawichai (Thai: กันทรวิชัย, pronounced [kān.tʰā.rá(ʔ).wí(ʔ).tɕʰāj]; Northeastern Thai: กันทรวิชัย, pronounced [kān.tʰā.là(ʔ).wì(ʔ).sâj]) is a district (amphoe) in the northern part of Maha Sarakham province, northeastern Thailand.

== Geography ==
Neighboring districts are (from the south clockwise): Mueang Maha Sarakham, Kosum Phisai, and Chiang Yuen of Maha Sarakham Province; Yang Talat and Khong Chai of Kalasin province.

== History ==
The district dates back to the Mueang Kanthang (กันทาง), which was founded in 1785 under the name Khanthathirat (คันธาธิราช). In 1874 it was renamed Mueang Kantharawichai.

The mueang was converted to a district in 1900. In 1913 it was transferred from Kalasin to Maha Sarakham Province, and in 1915 the district office in Ban Khok Phra was opened. In 1917 the district was renamed Khok Phra accordingly, but the historic name was restored in 1939.

== Administration ==
The district is divided into 10 sub-districts (tambons), which are further subdivided into 183 villages (mubans). Khok Phra is a township (thesaban tambon) which covers parts of tambon Khok Phra. There are a further 10 tambon administrative organizations (TAO).

Subdistrict population
| No. | Name | Thai name | Villages | Pop. |
|---|---|---|---|---|
| 1. | Khok Phra | โคกพระ | 15 | 9,381 |
| 2. | Khanthararat | คันธารราษฎร์ | 11 | 4,529 |
| 3. | Makha | มะค่า | 15 | 5,391 |
| 4. | Tha Khon Yang | ท่าขอนยาง | 15 | 7,775 |
| 5. | Na Si Nuan | นาสีนวน | 27 | 10,135 |
| 6. | Kham Riang | ขามเรียง | 23 | 12,496 |
| 7. | Khwao Yai | เขวาใหญ่ | 21 | 7,714 |
| 8. | Si Suk | ศรีสุข | 24 | 10,088 |
| 9. | Kut Sai Cho | กุดใส้จ่อ | 11 | 4,561 |
| 10. | Kham Thao Phatthana | ขามเฒ่าพัฒนา | 21 | 8,180 |
