= Yang Talat district =

District of Thailand

Yang Talat ยางตลาด
- District
- District location in Kalasin province
- Coordinates: 16°24′8″N 103°22′23″E
- Country: Thailand
- Province: Kalasin

Area
  - Total: 621.084 km^{2} (239.802 sq mi)

Population (2008)
  - Total: 129,022
  - Density: 207.2/km^{2} (537/sq mi)
- Time zone: UTC+7 (ICT)
- Postal code: 46120
- Geocode: 4607

Yang Talat (Thai: ยางตลาด, pronounced [jāːŋ tā.làːt]; Northeastern Thai: ยางตลาด, pronounced [ɲâːŋ tā.làːt]) is a district (amphoe) in the western part of Kalasin province, northeastern Thailand.

== Geography ==
Neighbouring districts are (from the northwest clockwise): Huai Mek, Nong Kung Si, Mueang Kalasin, and Khong Chai of Kalasin Province; Kantharawichai and Chiang Yuen of Maha Sarakham province.

== History ==
Originally named Pachim Kalasin (ปจิมกาฬสินธุ์), the district was renamed Phu Len Chang (ภูแล่นช้าง) in 1913. In 1917, it received its current name Yang Talat.

== Administration ==
The district is divided into 15 sub-districts (tambons), which are further subdivided into 207 villages (mubans). There are six sub-district municipalities (thesaban tambons): Yang Talat covers parts of tambon Yang Talat and Dok Si covers parts of tambons Dok Sombun and Um Mao. Bua Ban, Itue, Hua Na Kham, and Khao Phra Non are further sub-district municipalities which cover the whole same-named sub-district. There are a further 11 tambon administrative organizations (TAO).

No.	Name	Thai	Villages	Pop.
1.	Yang Talat	ยางตลาด	20	16,226
2.	Hua Ngua	หัวงัว	13	7,796
3.	Um Mao	อุ่มเม่า	12	7,443
4.	Bua Ban	บัวบาน	22	13,157
5.	Woe	เว่อ	11	4,414
6.	Itue	อิตื้อ	12	9,105
7.	Hua Na Kham	หัวนาคำ	19	13,090
8.	Nong I Thao	หนองอิเฒ่า	11	4,836
9.	Don Sombun	ดอนสมบูรณ์	14	8,324
10.	Na Chueak	นาเชือก	14	7,319
11.	Khlong Kham	คลองขาม	19	14,224
12.	Khao Phra Non	เขาพระนอน	9	5,866
13.	Na Di	นาดี	9	5,702
14.	Non Sung	โนนสูง	12	7,796
15.	Nong Tok Paen	หนองตอกแป้น	10	3,724
