= Kosum Phisai district =

Kosum Phisai โกสุมพิสัย
- District
- District location in Maha Sarakham province
- Coordinates: 16°14′55″N 103°4′1″E
- Country: Thailand
- Province: Maha Sarakham

Area
  - Total: 827.876 km^{2} (319.645 sq mi)

Population (2014)
  - Total: 120,584
  - Density: 143.9/km^{2} (373/sq mi)
- Time zone: UTC+7 (ICT)
- Postal code: 44140
- Geocode: 4403

Kosum Phisai (Thai: โกสุมพิสัย, pronounced [kōː.sǔm pʰí.sǎj]; Northeastern Thai: โกสุมพิสัย, pronounced [kòː.sǔm pʰì.sǎj]) is a district (amphoe) in the northern part of Maha Sarakham province, northeastern Thailand.

== Geography ==
Located on Highway 208, the town centre, after incorporating the area of Hua Khwang Subdistrict Administrative Organization in 2020, became an area of 6.54 square kilometers, with a population of 9,226 people and 4,204 households. At Almost exactly halfway between the cities of Khon Kaen and Maha Sarakham, the neighbouring districts are (from the north clockwise): Chiang Yuen, Kantharawichai, Mueang Maha Sarakham, Borabue, and Kut Rang of Maha Sarakham Province: Ban Phai, Ban Haet, and Mueang Khon Kaen of Khon Kaen province.

=== Kosumpisai Forest Park ===
Monkey Lake or 'Bung Ling' (บึง หลิง) as the forest is known locally, begins immediately in the Hua Khwang Subdistrict, a suburb some 500 metres from the town centre, and covers an area of approximately 175 rai (69 acres, 28 hectares). Bordered by the banks of the Chi River, the forest is a near-complete wetland ecosystem and features a natural 3 rai (about 1.2 acres) pond in the center that holds water year-round, with a depth of about 1-1.5 meters. In 2020, the Ministry of Natural Resources and Environment officially announced the area as a designated forest park. A major tourist attraction is the large population of over 1,000 semi-tame long-tail macaque monkeys.

== Administration ==
=== Central administration ===
Kosum Phisai is divided into 17 sub-districts (tambons), which are further subdivided into 235 administrative villages (mubans).

No.	Name	Thai	Villages	Pop.
1.	Hua Khwang	หัวขวาง	24	18,078
2.	Yang Noi	ยางน้อย	14	6,373
3.	Wang Yao	วังยาว	12	6,153
4.	Khwao Rai	เขวาไร่	20	11,007
5.	Phaeng	แพง	16	9,195
6.	Kaeng Kae	แก้งแก	10	4,318
7.	Nong Lek	หนองเหล็ก	20	9,780
8.	Nong Bua	หนองบัว	12	6,156
9.	Lao	เหล่า	11	4,474
10.	Khuean	เขื่อน	11	5,627
11.	Nong Bon	หนองบอน	11	5,934
12.	Phon Ngam	โพนงาม	12	6,749
13.	Yang Tha Chaeng	ยางท่าแจ้ง	10	4,800
14.	Hae Tai	แห่ใต้	19	6,437
15.	Nong Kung Sawan	หนองกุงสวรรค์	10	5,432
16.	Loeng Tai	เลิงใต้	12	3,975
17.	Don Klang	ดอนกลาง	11	6,096

=== Local administration ===
There is one sub-district municipality (thesaban tambon) in the district:

- Kosum Phisai (Thai: เทศบาลตำบลโกสุมพิสัย) consisting of parts of sub-district Hua Khwang.

There are 17 sub-district administrative organizations (SAO) in the district:

- Hua Khwang (Thai: องค์การบริหารส่วนตำบลหัวขวาง) consisting of parts of sub-district Hua Khwang.
- Yang Noi (Thai: องค์การบริหารส่วนตำบลยางน้อย) consisting of sub-district Yang Noi.
- Wang Yao (Thai: องค์การบริหารส่วนตำบลวังยาว) consisting of sub-district Wang Yao.
- Khwao Rai (Thai: องค์การบริหารส่วนตำบลเขวาไร่) consisting of sub-district Khwao Rai.
- Phaeng (Thai: องค์การบริหารส่วนตำบลแพง) consisting of sub-district Phaeng.
- Kaeng Kae (Thai: องค์การบริหารส่วนตำบลแก้งแก) consisting of sub-district Kaeng Kae.
- Nong Lek (Thai: องค์การบริหารส่วนตำบลหนองเหล็ก) consisting of sub-district Nong Lek.
- Nong Bua (Thai: องค์การบริหารส่วนตำบลหนองบัว) consisting of sub-district Nong Bua.
- Lao (Thai: องค์การบริหารส่วนตำบลเหล่า) consisting of sub-district Lao.
- Khuean (Thai: องค์การบริหารส่วนตำบลเขื่อน) consisting of sub-district Khuean.
- Nong Bon (Thai: องค์การบริหารส่วนตำบลหนองบอน) consisting of sub-district Nong Bon.
- Phon Ngam (Thai: องค์การบริหารส่วนตำบลโพนงาม) consisting of sub-district Phon Ngam.
- Yang Tha Chaeng (Thai: องค์การบริหารส่วนตำบลยางท่าแจ้ง) consisting of sub-district Yang Tha Chaeng.
- Hae Tai (Thai: องค์การบริหารส่วนตำบลแห่ใต้) consisting of sub-district Hae Tai.
- Nong Kung Sawan (Thai: องค์การบริหารส่วนตำบลหนองกุงสวรรค์) consisting of sub-district Nong Kung Sawan.
- Loeng Tai (Thai: องค์การบริหารส่วนตำบลเลิงใต้) consisting of sub-district Loeng Tai.
- Don Klang (Thai: องค์การบริหารส่วนตำบลดอนกลาง) consisting of sub-district Don Klang.
