= Maha Sarakham province =

Coordinates: 16°11′5″N 103°18′2″E

Maha Sarakham มหาสารคาม
- Province
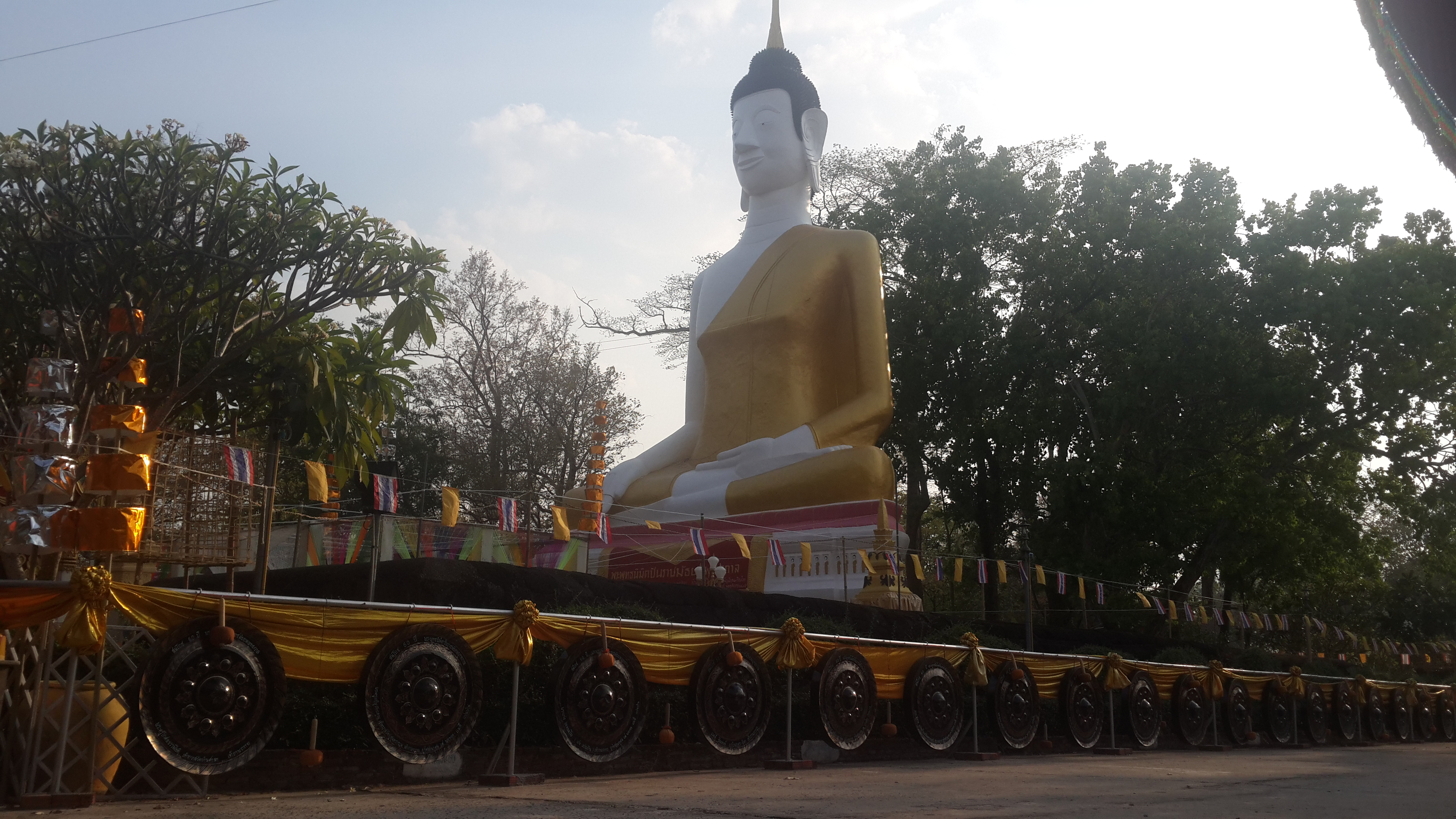
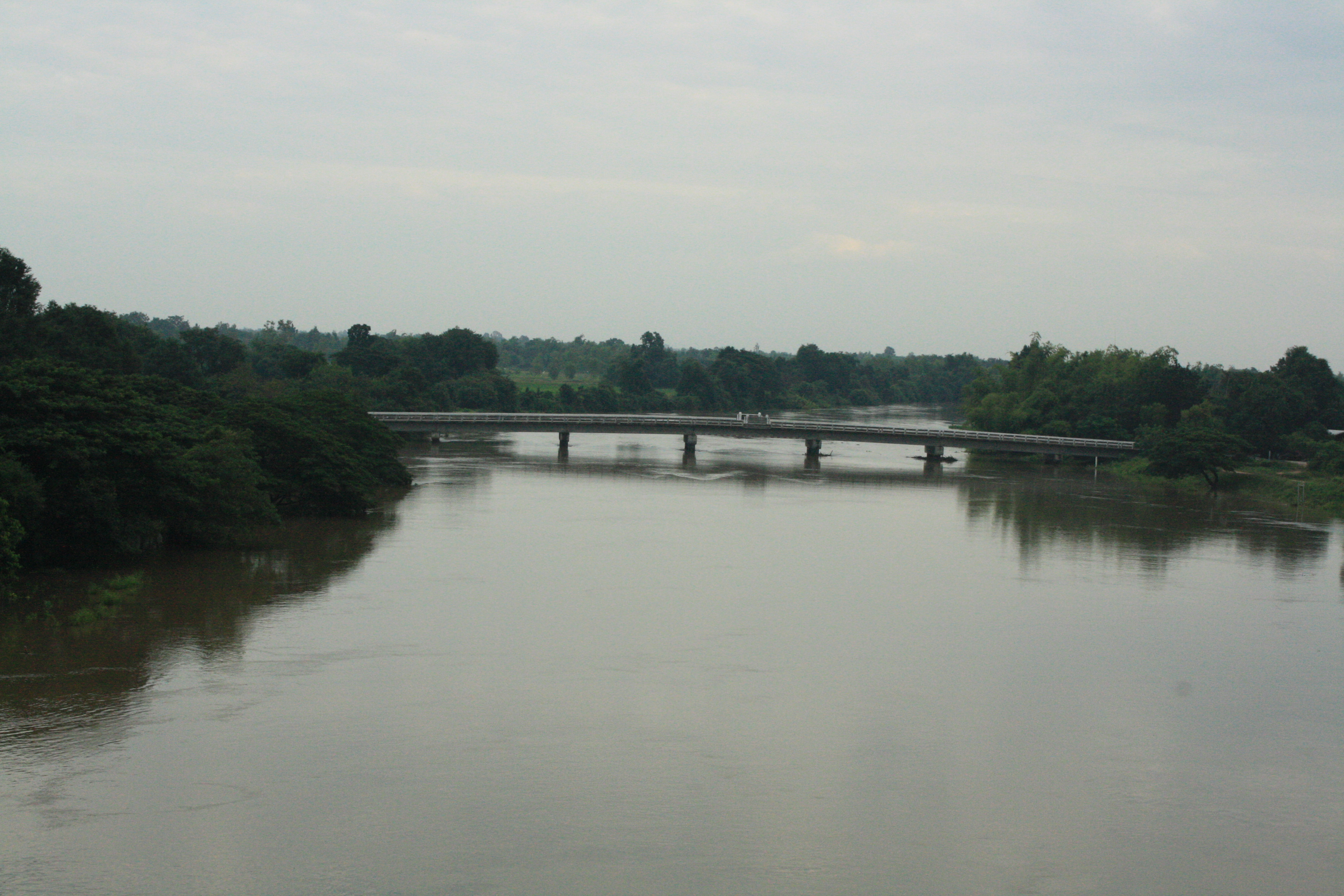
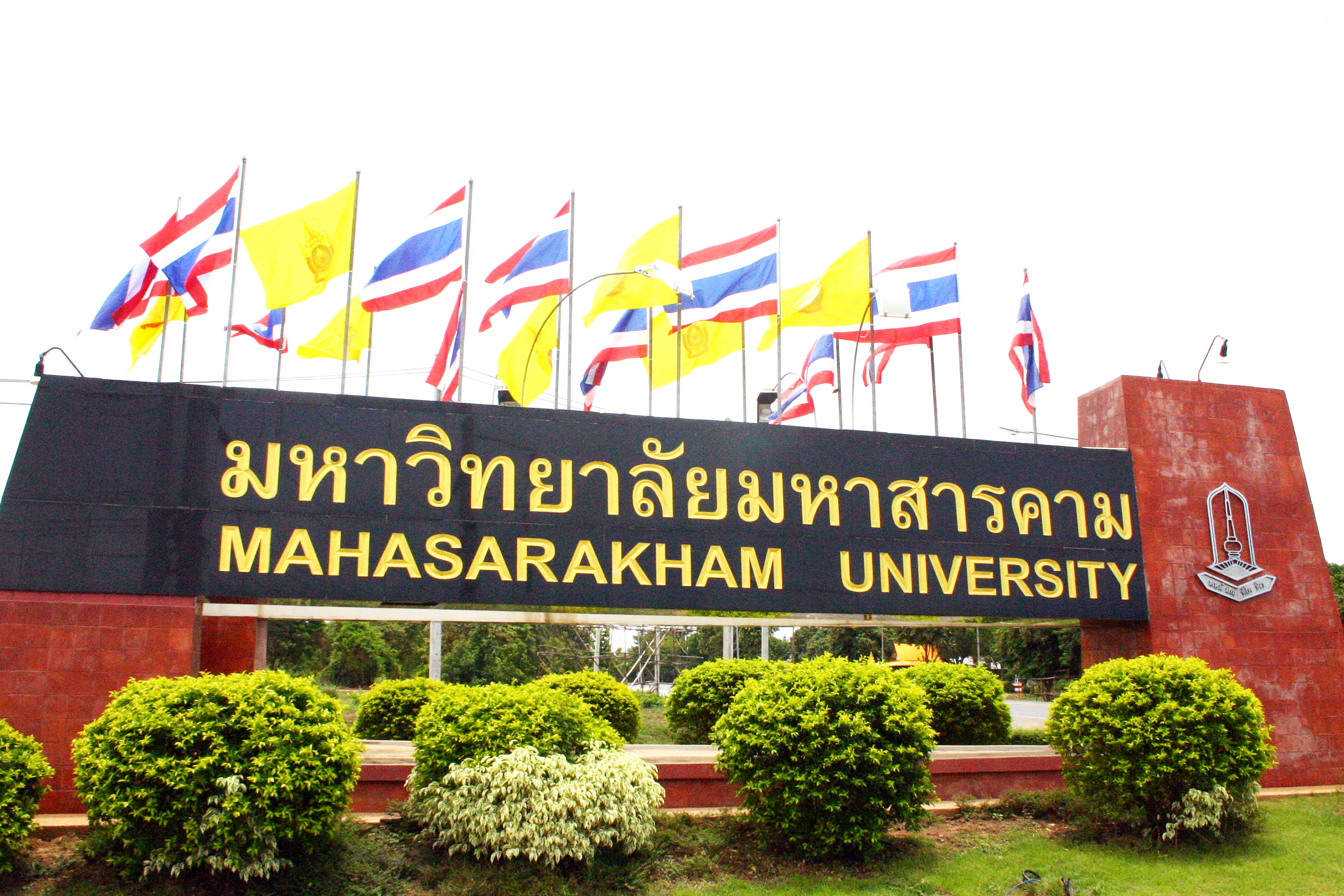
- From top: Wat Kusuntararam, Chi River in Maha Sarakham, Mahasarakham University (MSU)

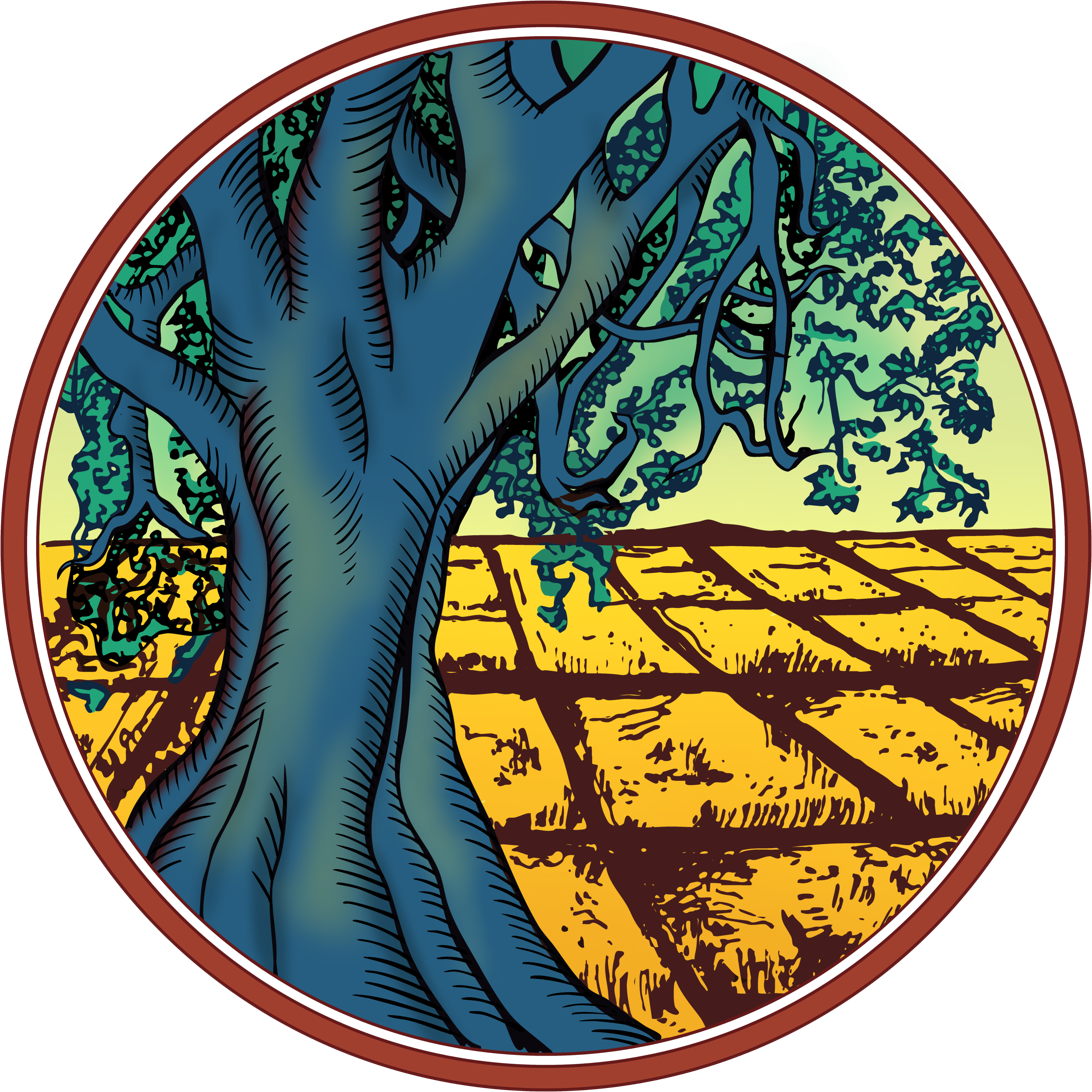
- Flag Seal
- Nickname: Sarakham
- Mottoes: พุทธมณฑลอีสาน ถิ่นฐานอารยธรรม ผ้าไหมล้ำเลอค่า ตักสิลานคร ("Phutthamonthon of Isan. Home of civilisation. Valuable silk. City of Taxila.")
- Map of Thailand highlighting Maha Sarakham province
- Country: Thailand
- Capital: Maha Sarakham

Government
  - Type: Province and Provincial Administrative Organization
  - Body: Maha Sarakham Province and Maha Sarakham Provincial Administrative Organization
  - Governor: Wiboon Waewbundit
  - PAO Chief Executive: Phonphat Charatsathian

Area
  - Total: 5,607 km^{2} (2,165 sq mi)
  - Rank: 39th

Population (2024)
  - Total: ▼929,952
  - Rank: 24th
  - Density: 166/km^{2} (430/sq mi)
  - Rank: 20th

Human Achievement Index
  - HAI (2022): 0.6523 "somewhat high" Ranked 24th

GDP
  - Total: baht 56 billion (US$1.9 billion) (2019)
- Time zone: UTC+7 (ICT)
- Postal code: 44xxx
- Calling code: 043
- ISO 3166 code: TH-44
- Website: mahasarakham.go.th

Maha Sarakham province, also written Maha Sarakham or Mahasarakham (Thai: มหาสารคาม, pronounced [mā.hǎː sǎː.rā.kʰāːm]; Northeastern Thai: มหาสารคาม, pronounced [mā.hǎː sǎː.lāː.kʰâːm]), known locally and simply as Sarakham (Thai: สารคาม, pronounced [sǎː.rā.kʰāːm]; Northeastern Thai: สารคาม, pronounced [sǎː.lā.kʰâːm]), is one of the 76 provinces (changwat) of Thailand. It lies in central northeastern Thailand, also called Isan. Its neighbouring provinces are (from north clockwise): Kalasin, Roi Et, Surin, Buriram, and Khon Kaen.

The town of Maha Sarakham is the provincial capital. It is the home of Mahasarakham University, one of the largest universities in northeast Thailand with 41,000 students (2017), and Rajabhat Mahasarakham University.

== Geography ==
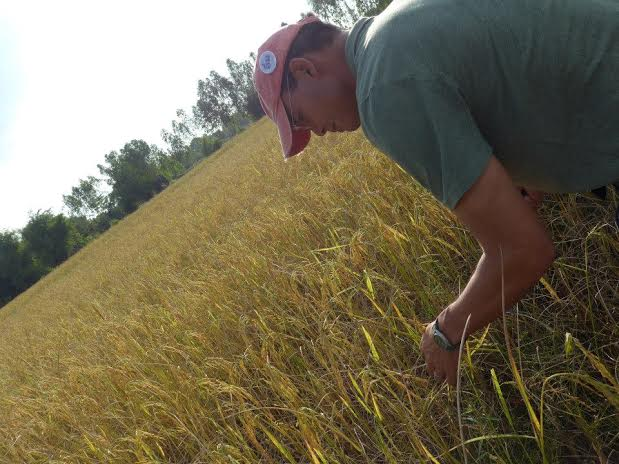
Rice maturing in the paddy in rural Maha Sarakham province.

The province is mostly a plain covered with rice fields. Only in the north and east are there small hills. The province is between 130 and 230 m above sea level. The main river is the Chi. The total forest area is 214 km^{2} (83 sq mi) or 3.8 percent of provincial area.

== History ==
=== Early period ===
A small moated and ramparted mound at Kantharawichai, 20 km west of Mueang Fa Daet in Kalasin, was excavated by the Fine Arts Department in 1972. The dig uncovered the brick and laterite foundations of an early Buddhist ordination hall of about 37 by 10 m, with Dvaravati-style ceramics and terracotta votive tablets. A terracotta bowl beneath the hall's main Buddha image held sixty-six silver repoussé plaques, most about 5 by 10 cm. Subhadradis Diskul read their style as the late Dvaravati of the tenth and eleventh centuries.

From the 8th to 10th centuries, several Buddhist relics originated from the ancient town of Champasi which is now in Amphoe Na Dun. Such relics, such as the relic of The Buddha has led speculation of a kingdom being located in the province. During this time and after, the province continued as a Buddhist center in Isan.

=== Modern history ===
Maha Sarakham was originally a satellite town of Roi Et, founded in 1865. The governor of Roi Et province sent 9,000 people to populate the new town, and one of his cousins as its governor. In 1868 the central government in Bangkok declared Maha Sarakham a province of its own under the supervision of Bangkok. One of the reasons was that this step weakened the power of Roi Et.

On April 3, 2023, provincial police arrested a 38-year-old man who they seized 322,000 methamphetamine tablets from him. He had been selling these in Ubon Ratchathani province and several other nearby provinces.

== Symbols ==
The provincial seal shows a tree in front of rice fields, symbolizing the richness of resources in the province.

The provincial flag shows the seal in the middle, in a brown horizontal strip. Above and below is a yellow strip. The brown color symbolizes the strength and the perseverance of the people in the province, who live in the rather dry climate; the yellow color symbolizes the robes of Buddhist monks as evidence of the faith of the people.

The provincial tree is the woman's tongue tree (Albizia lebbeck). The tree symbol was assigned to the province in 1994 by Queen Sirikit. The provincial flower is the West Indian jasmine (Ixora). The provincial aquatic life is the endemic freshwater crab Thaipotamon chulabhorn.

== Administration ==
Map of 13 districts

=== Provincial government ===
The province is divided into 13 districts (amphoes). The districts are further divided into 133 subdistricts (tambons) and 1,804 villages (mubans).

1. Mueang Maha Sarakham
2. Kae Dam
3. Kosum Phisai
4. Kantharawichai
5. Chiang Yuen
6. Borabue
7. Na Chueak
8. Phayakkhaphum Phisai
9. Wapi Pathum
10. Na Dun
11. Yang Sisurat
12. Kut Rang
13. Chuen Chom

=== Local government ===
As of 26 November 2019 there are: one Maha Sarakham Provincial Administration Organisation (ongkan borihan suan changwat) and 19 municipal (thesaban) areas in the province. Maha Sarakham has town (thesaban mueang) status. Further 18 subdistrict municipalities (thesaban tambon). The non-municipal areas are administered by 123 Subdistrict Administrative Organisations - SAO (ongkan borihan suan tambon).

== Human achievement index 2022 ==
Health	Education	Employment	Income
24	22	55	75
Housing	Family	Transport	Participation
38	21	30	14
Province Maha Sarakham, with an HAI 2022 value of 0.6523 is "somewhat high", occupies place 24 in the ranking.

Since 2003, United Nations Development Programme (UNDP) in Thailand has tracked progress on human development at sub-national level using the Human achievement index (HAI), a composite index covering all the eight key areas of human development. National Economic and Social Development Board (NESDB) has taken over this task since 2017.

Rank	Classification
1 - 13	"high"
14 - 29	"somewhat high"
30 - 45	"average"
46 - 61	"somewhat low"
62 - 77	"low"

Map with provinces and HAI 2022 rankings
