= Comparison of Lao and Thai =

Comparison of languages

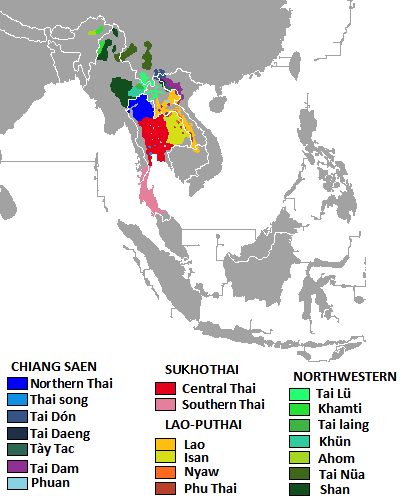
The Lao language (orange), the Lao language variety referred to as Isan in Thailand (yellow), and the Thai (red).

Lao and (Central) Thai are two closely related languages of the Southwestern branch of Tai languages. Lao falls within the Lao-Phuthai group of Southwestern Tai languages and Thai within the Chiang Saen language group. Lao (including Isan) and Thai, although they occupy separate groups, are mutually intelligible and were pushed closer through contact and Khmer influence, but all Southwestern Tai languages are mutually intelligible to some degree. Isan refers to the local development of the Lao language in Thailand, as it diverged in isolation from Laos, under Thai influence. The Isan language is still referred to as Lao by native speakers. Spoken Lao is mutually intelligible with Thai and Isan to such a degree that their speakers are able to effectively communicate with one another speaking their respective languages. These languages are written with slightly different scripts, the Lao script and Thai script, but are linguistically similar and effectively form a dialect continuum.

Although Thai and Lao (including Isan) are mutually intelligible, Thai speakers without previous exposure to the Isan language encounter several difficulties parsing the spoken language. Isan, written according to Thai etymological spelling, is fairly legible to Thai as the two languages share more than eighty percent cognate vocabulary, similar to the relationship between Spanish and Portuguese as changes in the meanings of terms, retention of archaisms, slightly different grammar and some vocabulary differences blur the close relationship. The relationship is asymmetric, with Isan speakers able to understand spoken and written Thai quite well due to its mandatory use in school and the popularity of Thai media and participation in Thai society, but many Isan students suffer the shock of switching from the Isan language of the home to the Central Thai-only primary school.

== False friends ==
Many Lao terms are very similar to words that are profane, vulgar or insulting in the Thai language, features that are much deprecated. Lao uses ອີ່ (/ʔīː/ and ອ້າຍ/archaic ອ້າຽ (/ʔâːj/), to refer to young girls and slightly older boys, respectively. In Thai, the similarly sounding อี, i (/ʔiː/) and ไอ้, ai (/ʔâj) are often prefixed before a woman's or man's name, respectively, or alone or in phrases that are considered extremely vulgar and insulting. These taboo expressions such as อีตัว "i tua", "whore" (/ʔiː tua/) and ไอ้บ้า, "ai ba", "weirdo" (/ʔâj bâː/).

False Cognates
Isan	Lao	IPA	Usage	Thai	IPA	Usage
บัก, bak	ບັກ, bak	/bák/	Used alone or prefixed before a man's name, only used when addressing a man of equal or lower socio-economic status and/or age.	บัก, bak	/bàk/	Alone, refers to a "penis" or in the expression บักโกรก, bak krok, or an unflattering way to refer to someone as "skinny".
หำน้อย, ham noi	ຫຳນ້ອຍ/archaic ຫຳນ້ຽ, ham noi	/hǎm nɔ̂ːj/	Although ham has the meaning of "testicles", the phrase bak ham noi is used to refer to a small boy. Bak ham by itself is used to refer to a "young man".	หำน้อย, ham noi	/hǎm nɔ́ːj/	This would sound similar to saying "small testicles" in Thai, and would be a rather crude expression. Bak ham is instead ชายหนุ่ม, chai num (/tɕʰāːj nùm/) and bak ham noi is instead เด็กหนุ่ม, dek num (/dèk nùm/) when referring to "young man" and "young boy", respectively, in Thai.
หมู่, mu	ໝູ່, mou	/mūː/	Mu is used to refer to a group of things or people, such as ໝູ່ເຮົາ/ຫມູ່ເຮົາ, mou hao (/mūː háw/), or "all of us" or "we all". Not to be confused for ໝູ/ຫມູ mou (/mŭː/), pig.	พวก, phuak	/pʰûak/	The Isan word หมู่ sounds like the Thai word หมู (/mŭː/), 'pig', in most varieties of Isan. To refer to groups of people, the equivalent expression is พวก, phuak (/pʰûak/), i.e., พวกเรา, phuak rao (/pʰûak rāw/) for "we all" or "all of us". Use of mu to indicate a group would make the phrase sound like "we pigs".
ควาย, khwai	ຄວາຍ/archaic ຄວາຽ, khouay	/kʰúaj/	Isan vowel combinations with the semi-vowel "ວ" are shorted, so would sounds more like it were written as ควย.	ควาย, khwai	/kʰwāːj/	Khwai as pronounced in Isan is similar to the Thai word ควย, khuai (/kʰu᷇aj/), which is another vulgar, slang word for "penis".

== Phonological differences ==
Thai and Lao share a similar phonology, being closely related languages, however, several developments occurred in Lao that clearly distinguish them. Tone, including patterns and quality, is the largest contributing factor and varies widely between varieties of Lao, but together they share splits quite distinct to Ayutthaya dialect (Standard Thai) and other Central Thai dialects. There are also several key sound changes that occurred in the Lao language that differentiates it from Thai.

=== Consonantal differences ===
Lao lacks the /r/ of formal Thai, replacing it with /h/ or /l/, as well as /tɕʰ/, which is replaced by /s/. Lao also has the consonant sounds /ɲ/ and /ʋ/, which are absent in Thai. Aside from these differences, the consonantal inventory is mostly shared between the two languages.

==== C_{1}C_{2} > C_{1} ====
Unlike Thai, the only consonant clusters that traditionally occur is C/w/, limited in Lao to /kw/ and /kʰw/ but only in certain environments as the /w/ is assimilated into a diphthongization process before the vowels /aː/, /am/, /aːj/ and /a/ thus limiting their occurrence. For example, Isan kwang (กว้าง, ກວ້າງ kouang, /kûaŋ/) is pronounced *kuang (*กว้ง, *ກວ້ງ) but kwaen as in kwaen ban (แกว้นบ้าน, ແກວ່ນບ້ານ khoèn ban, /kwɛ̄n bȃːn/), 'to feel at home', has a vowel that does not trigger the diphthongization. The consonant clusters of Proto-Tai had mostly merged in Proto-Southwestern Tai, but clusters were re-introduced with Khmer, Sanskrit, Pali and European loan words, particularly C/l/ and C/r/. Lao simplified the clusters to the first element, but sporadically maintained its orthographic representation as late as the early twentieth century although their pronunciation was simplified much earlier. This was likely an influence of Thai.

In some instances, some loan words are sometimes pronounced with clusters by very erudite speakers in formal contexts or in the speech of Isan youth that is very Thaified, otherwise the simplified pronunciation is more common. Lao speakers, especially erudite speakers may write and pronounce prôkram (ໂປຣກຣາມ, /pròː.kràːm/), via French programme (/pʁɔgʁam/), and maitri (ໄມຕຣີ, /máj.trìː/) from Sanskrit maitri (मैत्री, /maj triː/) are common, more often than not, they exist as pôkam (ໂປກາມ, /pòː.kàːm/) and maiti (ໄມຕີ, /máj tìː/), respectively. Similarly, Isan speakers always write and sometimes pronounce, in 'Thai fashion', maitri (ไมตรี, /ma᷇j.trīː/) and prokraem (โปรแกรม, /prōː.krɛ̄m/), via English 'programme' or 'program' (US), but most speakers reduce it to /ma᷇j.tīː/ and /pōː.kɛ̄ːm/, respectively, in normal speech.

Reduction of consonant clusters in Lao
Thai		Isan		Lao		Thai		Isan		Lao		Thai		Isan		Lao	
ก	/k/	ก	/k/	ກ	/k/	ค	/kʰ/	ค	/kʰ/	ຄ	/kʰ/	ผ	/pʰ/	ผ	/pʰ/	ຜ	/pʰ/
กร	/kr/	กร	/k/	ກ	/k/	คร	/kʰr/	คร	/kʰ/	ຄ	/kʰ/	ผล	/pʰl/	ผล	/pʰ/	ຜ	/pʰ/
กล	/kl/	กล	/k/	ກ	/k/	คล	/kʰl/	คล	/kʰ/	ຄ	/kʰ/	พ	/pʰ/	พ	/pʰ/	ພ	/pʰ/
ข	/kʰ/	ข	/kʰ/	ຂ	/kʰ/	ต	/t/	ต	/t/	ຕ	/t/	พร	/pʰr/	พร	/pʰ/	ພ	/pʰ/
ขร	/kʰr/	ขร	/kʰ/	ຂ	/kʰ/	ตร	/tr/	ตร	/t/	ຕ	/t/	พล	/pʰl/	พล	/pʰ/	ພ	/pʰ/
ขล	/kʰl/	ขล	/kʰ/	ຂ	/kʰ/	ป	/p/	ป	/p/	ປ	/p/						
						ปร	/pr/	ปร	/p/	ປ	/p/						
						ปล	/pl/	ปล	/p/	ປ	/p/						

Examples of cosonant cluster reduction in Lao
Thai		Isan		Lao		Gloss
เพลง phleng	/pʰlēːŋ/	เพลง phleng	/pʰêːŋ/	ເພງ phéng	/pʰéːŋ/	'song'
ขลุ่ย khlui	/kʰlùj/	ขลุ่ย khlui	/kʰūj/	ຂຸ່ຍ khouay	/kʰūj/	'flute'
กลาง klang	/klāːŋ/	กลาง klang	/kàːŋ/	ກາງ kang	/kàːŋ/	'centre' 'middle'
ครอบครัว khrop khrua	/kʰrɔ̂ːp kʰrūa/	ครอบครัว khrop khrua	/kʰɔ̂ːp kʰûa/	ຄອບຄົວ khop khoua	/kʰɔ̑ːp kʰúːə/	'family'

==== /r/ > /h/ ====
Proto-Southwestern Tai initial voiced alveolar trill /r/ remained [r] in Thai, (Note: This consonant replaced as [ɹ] by- Thai Chinese accent) although it is sometimes pronounced /l/ in informal environments, whereas Lao changed the sound to the voiceless glottal fricative /h/ in these environments. The sound change likely occurred in the mid-sixteenth century as the Tai Noi orthography after that period has the letter Lao letter 'ຮ' /h/, which was a variant of 'ຣ' /r/ used to record the sound change. The change also included numerous small words of Khmer origin such as hian ຮຽນ, /hían/), 'to learn', which is rian (เรียน, /rian/) in Thai, from Khmer riĕn (រៀន, /riən/).

Proto-Southwestern /r/ to /h/ in Lao
PSWT	Thai		Isan		Lao		Gloss
*rim	ริม rim	/rīm/	ฮิม him	/hîm/	ຮິມ him	/hím/	'edge', 'rim', 'shore' (Lao/Isan)
*rak	รัก rak	/rák/	ฮัก hak	/hàk/	ຮັກ hak	/hāk/	'to love'
*rɔn	ร้อน ron	/rɔ́ːn/	ฮ้อน hon	/hɔ̏ːn/	ຮ້ອນ hon	/hɔ̑ːn/	'to be hot'
*rɯə	เรือ ruea	/rɯ̄a/	เฮือ huea	/hɯ̂a/	ເຮືອ hua	/hɨ́ːə/	'boat'

==== /r/ > /l/ ====
The shift of Proto-Southwestern Tai */r/ to /h/ in Lao was inconsistent, with some factors that prevented the transition. Instead, these situations led to the shift of /r/ to the alveolar lateral approximant /l/, similar as to what occurs in informal, casual Thai. Polysyllabic loan words from Khmer as well as Indic sources such as Khmer and Pali may have seemed too 'foreign' compared to the monosyllabic loan words that may have been regarded as native, somewhat similar to English 'beef', ultimately from French boeuf but fully anglicized in spelling and pronunciation, versus more evidently French loan words such as crème anglaise, which retains a more French-like pronunciation. Thai speakers sometimes use /l/ in place of /r/ in relaxed, basilectal varieties but this is deprecated in formal speech.

- rasa (ຣາຊາ raxa, /láː.sáː/) from Sanskrit rājā (राजा, /raːdʒaː/), 'king', cf. Thai racha (ราชา, /rāː.tɕʰāː/), 'king'
- raka (ລາຄາ, /láː.kʰáː/), 'price' from Sanskrit rāka (राक, /raːka/), 'wealth', cf. Thai raka (ราคา, /rāː.kʰāː/)
- charoen (ຈະເລີນ chaluen, /tɕáʔ.lɤ́ːn/), 'prosperity', from Khmer camraeum (ចំរើន, /tɕɑm raən/), cf. Thai charoen (เจริญ, /tɕàʔ.rɤ̄ːn/)
- rabam (ລະບຳ, /lāʔ.bàm/, 'traditional dance', from Khmer rôbam (របាំ, /rɔ bam/), cf. Thai rabam (ระบำ, /ráʔ.bām/)

Lao and Thai both have digraphs, or in the case of Lao ligatures, that consist of a silent /h/ that was historically pronounced at some ancient stage of both languages, but now serves as a mark of tone, shifting the sound to a high-class consonant for figuring out tone. The /h/ may have prevented the assimilation of these words to /h/, as these end up as /l/ in Lao. Similarly, this may have also prevented /r/ to /h/ in Khmer loan words where it begins the second syllable.

- rue (ຫຼື/ຫລື lu, /lɯ̌ː/) versus rue (หรือ, /rɯ̌ː/), 'or' (conjunction)
- lio (ຫຼີ່ວ/ຫລີ່ວ, /līːw/ versus ri (หรี่, /rìː/), 'to squint' (one's eyes)
- kamlai (ກຳໄລ, /kàm.láj/), 'profit', from Khmer kâmrai (កំរៃ, /kɑm raj/), cf. Thai kamrai (กำไร, /kām.rāj/)
- samrap (ສຳລັບ samlap, /săm.lāp/), 'for' (the purpose of, to be used as, intended as), from Khmer sâmrap (សំរាប់, /sɑmrap/), cf. Thai samrap (สำหรับ, /sǎm.ràp/)

There are a handful of words where the expected conversion to /h/ did not take place, thus yielding /l/. In some cases, even in the Lao of Laos, this can be seen as historic Siamese influence, but it also may have been conservative retentions of /r/ in some words that resisted this change. For example, Isan has both hap (ฮับ, ຮັບ, /hāp/) and lap (รับ, ລັບ, /lāp/), both of which mean 'to receive' and are cognates to Thai rap (รับ, /ráp/), and the lap variety in Isan and parts of Laos, especially the south, may be due to Thai contact. In other cases, it is because the words are recent loans from Thai or other languages. In Isan, younger speakers often use /l/ in place of /h/ due to language shift.

- ro (ລໍ, /lɔ́ː/), 'to wait, to wait for', cf. Thai ro (รอ, /rɔ̄ː/)
- rot (ຣົຖ/ລົດ/ລົຖ/ lôt, /lōt/), 'car' or 'vehicle', cf. Thai rot (รถ, /rót/)
- lam (ລຳ, /lám/), 'to dance', cf. Thai ram (รำ, /rām/)
- rom (ໂຣມ/ໂລມ rôm, /lóːm/), 'Rome', cf. Thai rom (โรม, /rōːm/)
- rangkai (ร่างกาย, /lāːŋ.kāːj/) (Isan youth), traditionally hangkai (hāːŋ.kāːj, ຮ່າງກາຽ, /hāːŋ.kàːj/), 'body' (anatomic), cf. Thai rangkai (ร่างกาย, /râːŋ.kāːj/)

==== /tɕʰ/ > /s/ ====
Proto-Tai */ɟ/ and */ʑ/ had merged into Proto-Southwestern Tai */ɟ/, which developed into /tɕʰ/ in Thai, represented by the Thai letter 'ช'. Only a small handful of Proto-Tai words with */č/ were retained in Proto-Southwestern Tai, represented by the Tai letter 'ฉ', but this also developed into /tɕʰ/ in Thai and most words with 'ฉ' are either Khmer, Sanskrit or more recent loan words from Chinese dialects, particularly Teochew (Chaoshan Min). Thai also uses the letter 'ฌ' which only occurs in a handful of Sanskrit and Pali loan words where it represented /ɟʱ/, but in Thai has the pronunciation /tɕʰ/. Lao has developed /s/ where Thai has /tɕʰ/, with the letter 'ຊ' /s/, but romanized as 'x', is used to represent cognate words with Thai 'ช' or 'ฌ' whereas Thai 'ฉ' is replaced by Lao 'ສ' /s/ in analogous environments.

Isan speakers will sometimes substitute the Thai letter 'ซ' /s/ in place of Thai 'ช' /tɕʰ/ in cognate words, but this is never done to replace 'ฌ' /tɕʰ/ and sometimes avoided in formal, technical or academic word of Khmer, Sanskrit and Pali origins even if the pronunciation is still /s/, although educated Isan speakers and Isan youth may you use /tɕʰ/ due to code-switching or language shift. Similarly, the letter 'ฉ' /tɕʰ/ is usually retained even if it is better approximated by tone and phonology by 'ส' /s/ as is done in similar environments in Lao.

Source		Thai		Isan		Lao		Gloss
*/ʑaɰ/^{1}		เช่า chao	/tɕʰâw/	เช่า chao	/sāw/	ເຊົ່າ xao	/sāw/	'to hire'
*/ʑaːj/^{1}		ชาย chai	/tɕʰāːj/	ชาย chai	/sâːj/	ຊາຽ^{2}/ຊາຍ xai	/sáːj/	'male'
*/ɟaː/^{1}		ชา cha	/tɕʰāː/	ชา cha	/sâː/	ຊາ xa	/sáː/	'tea'
*/ɟɤ/^{1}		ชื่อ chue	/tɕʰɯ̂ː/	ชือ chue	/sɯ̄ː/	ຊື່ xu	/sɨ̄ː/	'name', 'to be called'
Khmer ឆ្លង chhlâng	/cʰlɑːŋ/	ฉลอง chalong	/tɕʰàʔ.lɔ̌ːŋ/	ฉลอง chalong	/sȁʔ.lɔ̌ːŋ/	ສລອງ^{2}/ສະຫຼອງ^{2}/ສະຫລອງ salong	/sáʔ.lɔ̌ːŋ/	'to celebrate'
*/ɟuai/^{1}		ช่วย chuai	/tɕʰûaj/	ซ่อย soi	/sɔ̄j/	ຊ່ຽ^{2}/ຊ່ວຽ^{2}/ຊ່ອຍ xoi	/sɔ̄ːj/	'to help'
Pali झान jhāna	/ɟʱaːna/	ฌาน chan	/tɕʰāːn/	ฌาน chan	/sâːn/	ຊານ xan	/sáːn/	'meditation'
Sanskrit छत्र chatra	/cʰatra/	ฉัตร chat	/tɕʰàt/	ฉัตร chat	/sȁt/	ສັດ sat	/sát/	'royal parasol'
Teochew 雜菜 zap cai	/tsap˨˩˧ tsʰaj˦̚ /	จับฉ่าย chap chai	/tɕàp tɕʰàːj/	จับส่าย chap sai	/tɕǎp sāːj/	ຈັບສ່າຽ^{2}/ຈັບສ່າຍ/ chap sai	/tɕáp sāːj/	'Chinese vegetable soup'

- ^1 Proto-Tai etymon.
- ^2 Pre-1975 Lao spelling.

==== /j/ < /ɲ/ and /j/ ====
Lao retains a distinction with some words retaining a alveolo-palatal nasal /ɲ/ from the merger Proto-Southwestern Tai */ɲ/ and */ʰɲ/ and some words with /j/ derived from the merger of Proto-Southwestern Tai */j/ and */ˀj/. The change may have persisted into Thai after the adoption of writing, as some words provide clues to their etymology. For example, Proto-Southwestern Tai */ɲ/ and */ʰɲ/ correspond to the Central and Southern Thai spellings 'ญ' and 'หญ' whereas */j/ and */ˀj/ correspond to Central and Southern Thai spellings 'ย' and 'อย', respectively, all of which have merged in pronunciation to /j/ in Thai, although as this pronunciation was likely lost shortly after literacy, not all Thai words have this corresponding spelling. Thai also uses the letter 'ญ' in words of Khmer, Sanskrit and Pali where the source language has /ɲ/ but these words now have /j/ pronunciation.

Lao maintains the distinction with the letters 'ຍ' /ɲ/ and 'ຢ' /j/, but /j/ is a rarer outcome in Lao and most instances of Thai 'ย' and 'ญ' or digraphs 'หย' and 'หญ' will result in Lao 'ຍ' /ɲ/ or 'ຫຽ/ຫຍ' /ɲ/. With a few exceptions, only Proto-Southwestern Tai */ˀj/ yields /j/. Lao, unlike Thai, has also adopted Khmer, Sanskrit and Pali loan words and retains the /ɲ/ pronunciation of the loan source languages, but has also converted the consonantal /j/ into /ɲ/ in borrowings. The Lao letter 'ຍ' also represents /j/, but only in diphthongs and triphthongs as a final element. As the Lao language of Isan is written in Thai according to Thai spelling rules, the phonemic distinction between /j/ into /ɲ/ cannot be made in the orthography, thus Isan speakers write ya 'ยา', which suggests ya (ยา, /jāː/), 'medicine' but is also used for [n]ya (ยา, ຍາ, /ɲáː/), an honorary prefix used to address a person who is same in age as one's grandparents. These are distinguished in Lao orthography, but Isan speakers either use context or a tone mark, as they differ in tone, to differentiate the words.

Source		Thai		Isan		Lao		Gloss
*/ɲuŋ/^{1}		ยุง yung	/jūŋ/	ยุง yung	/ɲûŋ/	ຍູງ nyung	/ɲúːŋ/	'mosquito'
*/ɲok/^{1}		ยก yok	/jók/	ยก yok	/ɲòk/	ຍົກ nyok	/ɲōk/	'to lift'
*/ʰɲiŋ/^{1}		หญิง ying	/jǐŋ/	ญิง ying	/ɲîŋ/	ຍິງ nying	/ɲíŋ/	'girl'
*/ʰɲaːp/^{1}		หยาบ yap	/jàːp/	หยาบ yap	/ɲàːp/	ຫຽາບ^{2}/ຫຍາບ nyap	/ɲȁːp/	'coarse' (texture)
*/jaːw/^{1}		ยาว yao	/jāːw/	ยาว yao	/ɲâːw/	ຍາວ gnao	/ɲáːw/	'long in length'
*/jaːm/^{1}		ยาม yam	/jāːm/	ยาม yam	/ɲâːm/	ຍາມ nyam	/ɲáːm/	'time', 'season'
*/ˀjuː/^{1}		อยู่ yu	/jù:/	อยู่ yu	/júː/	ຢູ່ you	/jūː/	'to be' (condition, location)
*/ˀja:/^{1}		ยา ya	/jā:/	ยา ya	/jàː/	ຢາ ya	/jàː/	'medicine'
Sanskrit यक्ष yakṣa	/jakʂa/	ยักษ์ yak	/ják/	ยักษ์ yak	/ɲàk/ /ják/^{2}	ຍັກສ໌^{2}/ຍັກ gnak	/ɲāk/	'ogre', 'giant'
Pali ञतति ñatti	/ɲatti/	ญัตติ yatti	/ját.tìʔ/	ญัตติ yatti	/ɲàt.tǐʔ/	ຍັຕຕິ^{2}/ຍັດຕິ nyatti	/ɲāt.tíʔ/	'parliamentary motion'

- ^1 Proto-Southwestern Tai etymon.
- ^2 Pre-1975 alternate Lao spelling.

==== /m/ > /l/ ====
The Proto-Southwestern Tai cluster *ml was simplified, producing an expected result of /l/ in Thai and /m/ in Lao. The Saek language, a Northern Tai language distantly related to Thai and Lao preserves these clusters. For instance, Proto-Southwestern Tai *mlɯn, 'to open the eyes', is mlong in Saek (มลอง, ມຼອງ, /màʔ.lɔ᷇ːŋ/) but appears as luem (ลืม, /lɯ̄ːm/) and muen (มืน, ມືນ mun, /mɯ́ːn/) in Lao.

Development of PSWT *ml to Lao /m/ versus Thai /l/
PSWT	Isan		Thai		Lao		Gloss
*mlɯn	มื่น muen	/mɯ̄ːn/	ลื่น luen	/lɯ̂ːn/	ມື່ນ muen	/mɨ̄ːn/	'slippery'
*mlaːŋ	ม้าง mang	/mȁːŋ/	ล้าง lang	/láːŋ/	ມ້າງ mang	/mȃːŋ/	'to destroy', 'to obliterate'
*mlen	เม็น men	/mên/	เล็น len	/lēn/	ເມັ່ນ men	/mēn/	'louse'

==== /w/ > /ʋ/ ====
Lao speakers generally pronounce cognates of Thai with initial /w/ as the voiced labiodental approximant /ʋ/, similar to a faint 'v', enough so that the French chose 'v' to transcribe the Lao letter 'ວ' /ʋ/. The letter is related to Thai 'ว' /w/. The sound /ʋ/ is particularly noticeable in the Vientiane and Central Lao dialects, with a strong pronunciation favored by the élite of Vientiane. In Isan, the rapid but forced resettlement of the people of Vientiane and surrounding areas to the right bank greatly boosted the Lao population, but likely led to some dialect leveling, which may explain the prevalence of /ʋ/ throughout the region, regardless of personal Isan dialect. The replacement is not universal, especially in Laos, but a shift towards /w/ is also occurring in Isan due to the persistent pressures of the Thai language since the sound /ʋ/ is considered provincial, being different from Thai, as opposed to Laos where it is the prestigious pronunciation. Due to the difference in pronunciation, the French-based system used in Laos uses 'v' whereas the English-based Thai system of romanization uses 'w', so the Lao city of Savannakhét would be rendered 'Sawannakhet' if using the Thai transcription.

Allophonic /ʋ/ in Lao absent in Thai
Isan		Thai		Lao		Gloss
เวร wen	/wêːn/	เวร wen	/wēːn/	ເວນ vén	/ʋéːn/	'sin'
เวียง wiang	/wîaŋ/	เวียง wiang	/wiaŋ/	ວຽງ viang	/ʋíːəŋ/	'walled city'
สวรรค์ sawan	/sȁʔ.wǎn/	สวรรค์ sawan	/sàʔ.wǎn/	ສະຫວັນ/ສວັນ/ສວັນຄ໌ savan	/sáʔ.ʋǎn/	'paradise'
หวาน wan	/wǎːn/	หวาน wan	/wǎːn/	ຫວານ van	/ʋǎːn/	'sweet'
วิษณุ witsanu	/wìt.sȁʔ.nùʔ/	วิษณุ witsanu	/wít.sàʔ.núʔ/	ວິດສະນຸ/ວິສນຸ vitsanou	/ʋīt.sáʔ.nūʔ/	'Vishnu'

==== /k/ > /tɕ/ ====
Another influence of the massive migration of the people of Vientiane to the right bank is the common tendency to replace the voiceless velar plosive /k/ with the voiceless alveolo-palatal affricate /tɕ/. For instance, the people of the city of Khon Chaen, more generally referred to as Khon Kaen (ขอนแก่น, ຂອນແກ່ນ Khon Ken, /kʰɔ̆ːn kɛ̄n/) in formal contexts, refer to their city as Khon Chaen (ขอนแจ่น, *ຂອນແຈ່ນ, /kʰɔ̆ːn tɕɛ̄n/) in more relaxed settings. In Laos, this is particularly an informal feature specific to Vientiane Lao but is not used in the official written and spoken standard as it is an informal variant, whereas in Isan, it is commonly used but deprecated as a regional mispronunciation. It is also limited to certain words and environments.

Allophonic /tɕ/ in some Lao words absent in Thai
Isan		Thai		Lao		Gloss
เกี้ยว/เจี้ยว kiao/chiao	/kîaw/, /tɕîaw/	เกี้ยว kiao	/kîaw/	ກ້ຽວ kiao	/kîːəw/, /tɕîːəw/	'to woo', 'to flirt'
เกี่ยง/เจี่ยง kiang/chiang	/kíaŋ/, /tɕíaŋ/	เกี่ยง kiang	/kìaŋ/	ກ່ຽງ kiang	/kīːəŋ/, /tɕīːəŋ/	'to argue', 'to disagree'
แก้ม/แจ้ม kaem/chaem	/kɛ̂ːm/, /tɕɛ̂ːm/	แก้ม kaem	/kɛ̂ːm/	ແກ້ມ kèm	/kɛ̂ːm/, /tɕɛ̂ːm/	'cheek'

=== Vocalic differences ===
==== C/w/ diphthongization ====
Lao innovated a diphthongization that assimilates the /w/ in instances of /kw/ and /kʰw/ in certain environments. This is triggered by the vowels /a/, /aː/, /aːj/ and /am/, but the cluster is retained in all other instances. The /w/ is converted to /u/ and the vowel is shortened to /a/. This is not shown in the orthography, as it must have evolved after the adoption of the Lao script in the fourteenth century. Cognate words in Lao where this diphthongization occurs have no alteration in spelling from Thai counterparts. For example, the Thai word for 'to sweep' is kwat (กวาด, /kwàːt/) but is kwat (ກວາດ kouat, /kȕat/) and has the suggested pronunciation /kwȁːt/ but is pronounced *kuat (*ກວດ kouat). The counterpart of Thai khwaen (แขวน, kʰwɛ̌ːn), 'to hang' (something) is also khwaen (ແຂວນ khwèn, /kʰwɛ̆ːn/) since the vowel /ɛː/ does not trigger diphthongization.

The vowels /a/, /aː/, /aːj/ and /am/ correspond to Thai '◌ั◌', '◌า', '◌าย' and '◌ำ' and the Lao '◌ັ◌', '◌າ', '◌າຽ/◌າຍ' and '◌ຳ'. The clusters that can undergo this transformation are /kw/, Thai 'กว' and Lao 'ກວ' or /kw/, Thai 'ขว' and 'คว and Lao 'ຂວ' and 'ຄວ'. The non-diphthongized pronunciations as used in Thai are also used by some Isan speakers as a result of Thai influence. In Laos, non-diphthongization is not incorrect, but may sound like a Thai-influenced hypercorrection or very pedantic. As it is the normal pronunciation in Laos and Isan, it limits the instances of consonant clusters that are permissible.

Diphthongization of vowels after consonant cluster C/w/
Cluster	Thai	Isan		Lao		Gloss
Cluster	Thai	Suggested Pronunciation	Actual Pronunciation	Suggested Pronunciation	Actual Pronunciation	Gloss
C/w/-/aː/-[C]	Cวา	Cวา	Cัว, CวC	Cວາ	*Cົວ, *CວC	'wide'
C/w/-/aː/-[C]	กว้าง kwang /kwâːŋ/	กว้าง kwang */kwâːŋ/	*ก้วง *kuang /kûaŋ/	ກວ້າງ *kwang */kwâːŋ/	*ກ້ວງ kouang /kûːəŋ/	'wide'
C/w/-/aːj/	Cวาย	Cวาย	*Cวย	Cວາຍ	*Cວຍ	'water buffalo'
C/w/-/aːj/	ควาย khwai /kʰwāːj/	ควาย *khwai */kʰwâːj/	*ควย khuai /kʰûaj/	ຄວາຍ *khwai */kʰwáːj/	*ຄວຍ khoui /kʰúːəj/	'water buffalo'
C/w/-/a/-C	CวัC	CวัC	*CวC	CວັC	*CວC	'to scoop' 'to gouge'
C/w/-/a/-C	ควัก khwak /kʰwák/	ควัก khwak */kʰwàk/	*ควก *khuak /kʰàk/	ຄວັກ *khwak */kʰwāk/	*ຄວກ khouak /kʰūːək/	'to scoop' 'to gouge'
C/w/-/am/	Cวำ	Cวำ	*Cวม	Cວຳ	*Cວມ	'to capsize a boat'
C/w/-/am/	คว่ำ khwam /kʰwâm/	คว่ำ khwam */kʰwām/	*ค่วม *khuam /kʰuām/	ຄວ່ຳ *khoam */kʰwām/	*ຄວ່ມ khouam /kʰuːə̄m/	'to capsize a boat'
C/w/-/ɛː/C	แCว	แCว		ແCວ		'to hang' (an object)
C/w/-/ɛː/C	แขวน khwaen /kʰwɛ̌ːn/	แขวน khwaen /kʰwɛ̌ːn/		ແຂວນ khwèn /kʰwɛ̌ːn/		'to hang' (an object)

==== /ua/ > /uːə/ ====
The Thai diphthongs and triphthongs with the component /ua/ undergo a lengthening of the /u/ to /uː/ and shortens the /a/ to /ə/, although the shortened diphthong can sound like /uː/ to Thai speakers. In Thai, this includes the vowels /ua/ represented medially by '◌ว◌' and finally by '◌ัว', /uaʔ/ by '◌ัวะ' and the final triphthong /uaj/ by '◌วย'. Lao has /uːə/ represented medially by '◌ວ◌' and finally by '◌ົວ', /uːəʔ/ by '◌ົວະ' and the final triphthong /uːəj/ by '◌ວຽ/◌ວຍ'. This may have been another innovation, like C/w/ diphthongization, that occurred after the adoption of writing as it is not represented orthographically.

Lengthening of /ua/ in Lao
Thai		Isan		Lao		Gloss
หัว hua	/hǔa/	หัว hua	/hǔa/	ຫົວ houa	/hŭːə/	'head'
ร่วม ruam	/rûam/	ฮ่วม huam	/hūam/	ຮ່ວມ houam	/hūːəm/	'to share', 'to participate'
ลัวะ lua	/lúaʔ/	ลัวะ lua	/lùaʔ/	ລົວະ loua	/lūːəʔ/	'Lawa people'
มวย muai	/mūaj/	มวย muai	/mûaj/	ມວຍ mouai	/múːəj/	'boxing'

==== /ɯ/ > /ɨ/ ====
The close back unrounded vowel /ɯ/ is centralized to the close central unrounded vowel /ɨ/ in Lao, which is not found in Thai. This also applies to all variants of /ɯ/ that occur in Thai, i.e., all cognates with instances of Thai /ɯ/ are Lao /ɨ/, including diphthongs and triphthongs that feature this vowel element. Some very traditional dialects of Southern Lao and the Phuan dialect front the vowel all the way to /iː/.

Centralization of /ɯ/ to /ɨ/ in Lao
Thai		Isan		Lao		Gloss
หมึก, muek	/mɯ̀k/	หมึก, muek	/mɯ̏k/	ມຶກ, muk	/mɨ̄k/	'squid'
ลือ, lue	/lɯ̄ː/	ลือ, lue	/lɯ̂ː/	ລື, lu	/lɨ́ː/	'rumour'/'rumor' (US)
เมื่อไร, muea rai	/mɯ̂a rāj/	เมื่อใด, muea dai	/mɯ̄a dàj/	ເມື່ອໃດ, mua dai	/mɨ̄ːə dàj/	'when'
เรื่อย, rueai	/rɯ̂aj/	เรื่อย, rueai	/lɯ̄aj/	ເລຶ້ອຽ/ເລຶ້ອຍ, luai	/lɨ̑ːəj/	'often', 'repeatedly'

==== /ɤ/ > /ɘ/ ====
The close-mid back unrounded vowel /ɤ/ is centralized to the close-mid central unrounded vowel /ɘ/ in Lao. Similar to the conversion of /ɯ/ to /ɨ/, it also affects all instances in diphthongs as well.

Centralization of /ɤ/ to /ɘ/ in Lao
Thai		Isan		Lao		Gloss
เงิน, ngoen	/ŋɤ̄n/	เงิน, ngoen	/ŋɤ̂n/	ເງິນ, nguen	/ŋɘ́n/	'money'
เผลอ, phloe	/pʰlɤ̌ː/	เผลอ, phloe	/pʰɤ̌ː/	ເຜີ, pheu	/pʰɘ̆ː/	'to make a mistake', 'unaware'
เดิม, doem	/dɤ̄ːm/	เดิม, doem	/dɤ̀ːm/	ເດີມ, deum	/dɘ̀ːm/	'original', 'former'
เคย, khoei	/kʰɤ̄ːj/	เคย, khoei	/kʰɤ̂ːj/	ເຄີຽ/ເຄີຍ, kheui	/kʰɘ́ːj/	'to be accustomed to', 'to be habitual to'

==== Epenthetic vowels ====
Abugida scripts traditionally do not notate all vowels, especially the short vowel /a/, usually realized as /aʔ/ in Thai and Lao phonology. This especially affects the polysyllabic loan words of Sanskrit, Pali or Khmer derivation. Instances of when or when not to pronounce a vowel have to be learned individually as the presence of the vowel is inconsistent. For example, the Sanskrit word dharma (धर्म, /d̪ʱarma/), which can mean 'dharma', 'moral' or 'justice', was borrowed into Thai as simply tham (ธรรม /tʰām). As a root, it appears as simply tham as in thammakaset (ธรรมเกษตร /tʰām.máʔ.kàʔ.sèːt/) 'land of justice' or 'righteous land' with the /aʔ/ or thammanit (ธรรมนิตย์ /tʰām.máʔ.nít/), 'moral person' with /aʔ/. This is not always justified by etymology, as the terms derive from Sanskrit dharmakṣetra (धर्मक्षेत्र, /d̪ʱarmakʂetra/)—actually signifies 'pious man' in Sanskrit—and dharmanitya (धर्मनित्य, /d̪ʱarmanit̪ja/), respectively, both of which feature a pronounced but unwritten /a/. Lao and most Isan speakers in relaxed environments will pronounce the 'extra' vowel yielding *thammakaset (ธรรมเกษตร, ທັມມະກເສດ/ທັມມະກເສດຣ໌/ທຳມະກະເສດ thammakasét, /tʰám.māʔ.káʔ.sȅːt/) and thammanit (ธรรมนิตย์, ທັມມະນິດ/ທັມມະນິຕຍ໌/ທຳມະນິດ, /tʰám.māʔ.nīt/). There are also instances where Thai has the epenthetic vowel lost in Lao, such as krommathan (กรมธรรม์, /krōm.máʔ.tʰān/), 'debt contract', whereas Lao has nativized the pronunciation to kromtham (ກົມທັນ/ກົມທໍາ kômtham, /kòm.tʰám/). This is an exception, as the extra vowel is a sign of Lao-retained pronunciation such as Thai chit (จิตร, /tɕìt/), 'painting' from Sanskrit citra (चित्र, /t͡ʃit̪ra/), which is chit (จิตร, ຈິຕຣ໌/ຈິດ, /tɕít/), chit[ta] (จิตร, ຈິດຕະ chitta, /tɕít.táʔ/) or extremely epentheticized chit[tara] (จิตร, ຈິດຕະຣະ/ຈິດຕະລະ chittala, /tɕít.táʔ.lāʔ/ in Isan.

As another feature of Isan that deviates from Thai, it is deprecated. Few Isan people are aware that the stigmatized pronunciations are actually the 'proper' Isan form inherited from Lao. Many of these loan words are limited to academic and formal contexts that usually trigger code-switching to formal Thai, thus Isan speakers may pronounce these words more akin to Thai fashion although to varying degrees of adaptation to Isan pronunciation. Lao speakers also tend to insert epenthetic vowels in normal speech, as opposed to standard Thai where this is less common, thus 'softening' the sentence and making dialogue-less staccato. For instance, the Isan phrase chak noi (จักน้อย, ຈັກນ້ຽ/ຈັກນ້ອຽ/ຈັກນ້ອຍ /tɕʰák nɔ̑ːj/), which means 'in just a bit' is often pronounced chak-ka noy (*จักกะน้อย /tɕʰǎk.kǎʔ.nɔ̑ːj/, cf. Lao *ຈັກກະນ້ອຍ) but this may be perceived as 'slurred' speech to Thai speakers.

Isan		Thai		Lao		Sanskrit/Pali		Gloss
จิตวิทยา chittawithaya	/tɕǐt.tǎʔ.wìt.tʰàʔ.ɲâː/^{1} /tɕǐt.wìt.tʰàʔ.ɲâː/^{2}	จิตวิทยา chittawitthaya	/tɕìt.tàʔ.wít.tʰáʔ.jāː/	ຈິດຕະວິດທະຍາ chittavitthagna (*จิดตะวิดทะยา)	/tɕít.táʔ.ʋít.tʰāʔ.ɲáː/	चित् + चित्विद्या cit + vidya	/tɕit/ + /ʋid̪jaː/	'psychology'
มัศยา matsaya	/màt.sȁʔ.ɲǎː/^{1} /màt.ɲǎː/^{2}	มัศยา matsaya	/mát.sàʔ.jǎː/	ມັສຍາ/ມັດສະຍາ matsagna (*มัดสะยา)	/māt.sáʔ.ɲăː/	मत्स्य matsya	/mat̪sja/	'fish'
กรมธรรม์ krommathan	/kòm.tʰâm/^{1} /kòm.màʔ.tʰân/	กรมธรรม์ krommathan	/krōm.máʔ.tʰān/	ກົມທໍາ/ກົມທັນ ກົມມະທັນ kômtham kômmatham (*กมทัม) (*กมมะทัน)	/kòm.tʰám/ /kòm.māʔ.tʰán/	क्रमधर्म kramadharma	/kramad̪ʱarma/	'debt contract'
อดีตชาติ adittachat	/ʔǎʔ.dìːt.tǎʔ.sâːt/^{1} /ʔǎʔ.dìːt.sâːt/^{2}	อดีตชาติ adittachat	/ʔàʔ.dìːt.tàʔ.tɕʰâːt/	ອະດີດຊາດ ອະດິດຕະຊາດ aditxat adittaxat (*อดีดซาด) (*อดีดตะซาด)	/ʔáʔ.dȉːt.táʔ.sȃːt/ /ʔáʔ.dȉːt.sȃːt/	आदिता + जाति aditya + jati	/ad̪it̪ja/ + /dʒat̪i/	'previous incarnation'
จิตรกรรม chittrakam	/tɕǐt.tǎʔ.kàm/	จิตรกรรม chittrakam	/tɕìt.tràʔ.kām/	ຈິດຕະກັມ chittakam (*จิดตะกัม)	/tɕít.táʔ.kàm/	चित्रकर्म citrakarma	/tɕit̪rakarma/	'painting'
วาสนา watsana	/wâːt.sȁʔ.nǎː/ /wâː.sȁʔ.nǎː/^{3}	วาสนา watsana	/wâːt.sàʔ.nǎː/	ວາດສນາ/ວາສນາ/ວາດສະໜາ vatsana (*วาดสะหนา)	/ʋȃːt.sáʔ.năː/	वस्न vasna	/ʋasna/	'fortune'

- ^1 Basilectal Isan pronunciation based on historic Lao usage.
- ^2 'Lao-ified' pronunciation influenced by formal Thai.
- ^3 Hypercorrection amongst the educated to approximate Sanskrit pronunciation.

== Grammatical differences ==
=== Classifiers ===
Lao Classifiers
Isan	Thai	Lao	Category
คน (ฅน), /kʰôn/	คน (ฅน), /kʰōn/	ຄົນ, /kʰón/	People in general, except clergy and royals.
คัน, /kʰân/	คัน, /kʰān/	ຄັນ, /kʰán/	Vehicles, also used for spoons and forks in Thai.
คู่, /kʰūː/	คู่, /kʰûː/	ຄູ່, /kʰūː/	Pairs of people, animals, socks, earrings, etc.
ฉบับ, /sȁʔ.bǎp/	ฉบับ, /tɕʰàʔ.bàp/	ສະບັບ, /sáʔ.báp/	Papers with texts, documents, newspapers, etc.
ตัว, /tùa/	ตัว, /tūa/	ໂຕ, /tòː/	Animals, shirts, letters; also tables and chairs (but not in Lao).
กก, /kǒk/	ต้น, /tôn/	ກົກ, /kók/	Trees. Lao ຕົ້ນ is used in all three for columns, stalks, and flowers.
หน่วย, /nūaj/	ฟอง, /fɔ̄ːŋ/	ໜ່ວຍ, /nūaj/	Eggs, fruits, clouds. ผล (/pʰǒn/) used for fruits in Thai.

=== Pronouns ===
Although all the Tai languages are pro-drop languages, which omit pronouns if their use is unnecessary due to context, especially in informal contexts, they are restored in more careful speech. Lao frequently uses the first- and second-person pronouns and rarely drops them in speech compared to Thai, which can sometimes seem more formal and distant. More common is to substitute pronouns with titles of professions or extension of kinship terms based on age, thus it is very common for lovers or close friends to call each other 'brother' and 'sister' and to address the very elderly as 'grandfather' or 'grandmother'. Isan traditionally uses the Lao-style pronouns, although in formal contexts, the Thai pronouns are sometimes substituted as speakers adjust to the socially mandated use of Standard Thai in very formal events.

To turn a pronoun into a plural, it is most commonly prefixed with mu (ຫມູ່/ໝູ່ /mūː/) but the variants tu (ຕູ /tùː/) and phuak (ພວກ /pʰûak/) are also used by some speakers. These can also be used for the word hao, 'we', in the sense of 'all of us' for extra emphasis. The vulgar pronouns are used as a mark of close relationship, such as long-standing childhood friends or siblings and can be used publicly, but they can never be used outside of these relationships as they often change statements into very pejorative, crude or inflammatory remarks.

Person	Isan		Thai				Lao		Gloss
1st	ข้าน้อย khanoi	/kʰàː.nɔ̏ːj/	กระผม kraphom	/kràʔ.pʰǒm/	ดิฉัน dichan	/dìʔ.tɕʰǎn/	ຂ້ານ້ອຍ/ຂ້ານ້ອຽ khanoy	/kʰȁː.nɔ̑ːj/	I/me (formal)
1st	ข้อย khoi	/kʰɔ̀j/	ผม phom	/pʰǒm/	ฉัน	/tɕʰǎn/	ຂ້ອຍ/ຂ້ອຽ khoy	/kʰɔ̏ːj/	I/me (common)
1st	ข้า kha	/kʰàː/	ข้า kha		/kʰâː/		ຂ້າ kha	/kʰȁː/	I/me (from high-status to low-status or familiar; informal)
1st	กู ku	/kùː/	กู ku		/kūː/		ກູ kou	/kùː/	I/me (impolite/vulgar)
1st	ผู้ข้า phukha	/pʰùː.kʰàː/	ข้าพเจ้า khaphachao		/kʰâː.pʰáʔ.tɕâːw/		ຂ້າພະເຈົ້າ khaphachao	/kʰȁː.pʰāʔ.tɕâw/	I/me (very formal)
1st	เฮา hao	/hâw/	เรา rao		/rāw/		ເຮົາ hao	/háw/	we/us (common)
1st	หมู่เฮา mu hao	/mūː hâw/	พวกเรา phuak rao		/pʰûak rāw/		ພວກເຮົາ phouak hao	/pʰûak háw/	we/us (common)
2nd	ท่าน than	/tʰāːn/	ท่าน than		/tʰâːn/		ທ່ານ than	/tʰāːn/	you (highly honorific; formal)
2nd	เจ้า chao	/tɕâw/	คุณ khun		/kʰūn/		ເຈົ້າ chao	/tɕȃw/	you (common)
2nd	เอ็ง eng	/ʔèŋ/	แก kae	/kɛ̄ː/	เอ็ง eng	/ʔēŋ/	ສູ sou	/sŭː/	you (from high-status to low-status or familiar; informal)
2nd	มึง mueng	/mɯ̂ŋ/	มึง mueng		/mɯ̄ŋ/		ມຶງ meung	/mɯ́ŋ/	you (impolite/vulgar)
2nd	หมู่ท่าน mu than	/mūː tʰāːn/	พวกท่าน phuak than		/pʰûak tʰâːn/		ພວກທ່ານ phouak than	/pʰûak tʰāːn/	you (pl., formal)
2nd	หมู่เจ้า mu chao	/mūː tɕȃw/	พวกคุณ phuak khun		/pʰûak kʰūn/		ພວກເຈົ້າ phouak chao	/pʰûak tɕȃw/	you (pl., common)
3rd	เพิ่น phoen	/pʰɤ̄n/	ท่าน than		/tʰâːn/		ເພິ່ນ pheun	/pʰɤ̄n/	he/she (formal)
3rd	เขา khao	/kʰǎw/	เขา khao		/kʰǎw/		ເຂົາ khao	/kʰăw/	he/she (common)
3rd	ลาว lao	/lâːw/	เขา khao		/kʰǎw/		ລາວ lao	/láːw/	he/she (common)
3rd	มัน man	/mân/	มัน man		/mān/		ມັນ man	/mán/	it, he/she (offensive if used to refer to a person)
3rd	ขะเจ้า khachao	/kʰȁʔ.tɕȃw/	พวกท่าน phuak than		/pʰûak tʰâːn/		ເຂົາເຈົ້າ khao chao	/kʰǎw tɕâw/	they (formal)
3rd	หมู่เขา mu khao	/mūː kʰǎw/	พวกเขา phuak khao		/pʰûak kʰǎw/		ພວກເຂົາ phouak khao	/pʰûak kʰǎw/	they (common)
3rd	หมู่ลาว mu lao	/mūː la᷇ːw/	พวกเขา phuak khao		/pʰûak kʰǎw/		ຫມູ່ລາວ/ໝູ່ລາວ mou lao	/mūː láːw/	they (common)

== Tones ==
Comparison of Thai with Vientiane Lao and Isan tonal patterns
Tone Class	Inherent Tone	ไม้เอก (อ่)	ไม้โท (อ้)	Long Vowel	Short Vowel
High (Thai/Vientiane)	Rising/Rising	Low/Middle	Falling/Mid-Low	Low/Mid-Low	Low/High
High (Thai/Isan)	Rising/Rising	Low/Middle	Falling/Low	Low/Low	Low/Mid-low
Middle (Thai/Vientiane)	Middle/Low	Low/Middle	Falling/Mid-Low	Low/Mid-Low	Low/High
Middle (Thai/Isan)	Middle/Low	Low/High	Falling/Falling	Low/Low	Low/Rising
Low (Thai/Vientiane)	Middle/High	Falling/Middle	High/Falling	Falling/Falling	High/Middle
Low (Thai/Isan)	Middle/Falling	Falling/Middle	High/Mid-low	Falling/Falling	High/Low

Even Thai words with clear cognates in Lao can differ remarkably by tone. Determining the tone of a word by spelling is complicated. Every consonant falls into a category of high, middle or low class. Then, one must determine whether the syllable has a long or a short syllable and whether it ends in a sonorant or plosive consonant and, if there are any, whatever tone marks may move the tone. Thai กา ka, crow, has a middle tone in Thai, as it contains a mid-class consonant with a long vowel that does not end in a plosive. In Standard Lao, the same environments produce a low tone /kàː/ but is typically /kâː/ or rising-mid-falling in Western Lao.

Despite the differences in pattern, the orthography used to write words is nearly the same in Thai and Lao, even using the same tone marks in most places, so it is knowing the spoken language and how it maps out to the rules of the written language that determine the tone. However, as the Tai languages are tonal languages, with tone being an important phonemic feature, spoken Lao words out of context, even if they are cognate, may sound closer to Thai words of different meaning. Thai คา kha /kʰāː/, 'to stick' is cognate to Lao ຄາ, which in Vientiane Lao is pronounced /kʰáː/, which may sound like Thai ค้า kha /kʰáː/, 'to trade' due to similarity in tone. The same word in some parts of Isan near Roi Et Province would confusingly sound to Thai ears like ขา kha /kʰǎː/ with a rising tone, where the local tone patterns would have many pronounce the word with a rising-high-falling heavier on the rising. Although a native Thai speaker would be able to pick up the meaning of the similar words of Lao through context, and after a period of time, would get used to the different tones (with most Lao speech varieties having an additional one or two tones to the five of Thai), it can cause many initial misunderstandings.

== Lexical differences ==
Although the majority of Lao words are cognate with Thai, many basic words used in everyday conversation lack cognates in Thai. Some usages vary only by frequency or register. For instance, the Thai question word 'เท่าไหร่' is cognate with Lao 'ເທົ່າໃດ' /tʰāw.dàj/, but Lao tends to use a related variant form 'ท่อใด' /tʰɔ̄ː.dāj/ and 'ທໍ່ໃດ' /tʰɔ̄ː.dàj/, respectively, more frequently, although the usage is interchangeable and preference probably more related to region and person.

In other areas, Lao preserves the older Tai vocabulary. For example, the old Thai word for a 'glass', such as a 'glass of beer' or 'glass of water' was 'จอก' chok /tɕɔ̀ːk/, but this usage is now obsolete as the word has been replaced by Thai 'แก้ว' kaeo /kɛ̑ːw/. Conversely, Lao continues to use 'ຈອກ' chok to mean 'glass' (of water) as /tɕɔ̏ːk/, but Lao 'ແກ້ວ' kéo /kɛ̑ːw/ retains the earlier meaning of Thai 'แก้ว' as 'gem', 'crystal' or 'glass' (material) still seen in the names of old temples, such as 'Wat Phra Kaew' or 'Temple of the Holy Gem'. Nonetheless, a lot of cognate vocabulary is pronounced differently in vowel quality and tone and sometimes consonant sounds to be unrecognizable or do not share a cognate at all. For example, Lao ບໍ່ /bɔ̄ː/ bo is not related to Thai ไม่ /mâj/, mai

Lao vocabulary distinct from Thai
English	Isan	Lao	Thai
"no", "not"	บ่, [bɔ́ː], bo	ບໍ່, [bɔ̄ː], bo	ไม่, [mâj], mai
"to speak"	เว้า, [wȁw], wao	ເວົ້າ, [wâw], vao	พูด, [pʰûːt], phut
"how much"	เท่าใด, [tʰāw.dàj], thaodai	ທໍ່ໃດ, [tʰɔ̄ː.dàj], thodai	เท่าไร*, [tʰâw.rāj], thaorai
"to do, to make"	เฮ็ด, [hèt], het*	ເຮັດ, [hēt], het	ทำ*, [tʰām], tham
"to learn"	เฮียน, [hîan], hian	ຮຽນ, [hían], hian	เรียน, [rīan], rian
"glass"	จอก, [tɕɔ̀ːk], chok	ຈອກ, [tɕɔ̏ːk], chok	แก้ว*, [kɛ̂ːw], kaeo
"yonder"	พู้น, [pʰȕn], phun	ພຸ້ນ, [pʰûn], phoune	โน่น, [nôːn], non
"algebra"	พีชคณิต, [pʰîː.sà(ʔ).kʰā.nìt], phitchakhanit	ພີຊະຄະນິດ/Archaic ພີຊຄນິດ, [pʰíː.sā(ʔ).kʰā.nīt], phixakhanit	พีชคณิต, [pʰīː.tɕʰá(ʔ).kʰā.nít], phichakhanit
"fruit"	บักไม้, [bǎk.mȁj], bakmai	ໝາກໄມ້, [mȁːk.mâj], makmai	ผลไม้, [pʰǒn.lā.máːj], phonlamai
"too much"	โพด, [pʰôːt], phot	ໂພດ, [pʰôːt], phôt	เกินไป, [kɤ̄ːn pāj], koen pai
"to call"	เอิ้น, [ʔɤ̂ːn], oen	ເອີ້ນ, [ʔɤ̂ːn], une	เรียก, [rîak], riak
"a little"	หน่อยนึง, [nɔ̄j nɯ̂ŋ], noi neung	ໜ່ອຍນຶ່ງ/Archaic ໜ່ຽນຶ່ງ, [nɔ̄j nɯ̄ŋ], noi nung	นิดหน่อย, [nít nɔ̀j], nit noi
"house, home"	เฮือน, [hɯ̂an], huean	ເຮືອນ*, [hɯ́an], huane	บ้าน*, [bâːn], ban
"to lower"	ลด, [lòt], lot	ຫຼຸດ/ຫລຸດ), [lút], lout	ลด, [lót], lot
"sausage"	ไส้อั่ว, [sàj ʔúa], sai ua	ໄສ້ອ່ົວ, [sȁj ʔūa], sai-oua	ไส้กรอก, [sâj.krɔ̀ːk], saikrok
"to walk"	ย่าง, [ɲāːŋ], yang	ຍ່າງ, [ɲāːŋ], gnang	เดิน, [dɤ̄ːn], doen
"philosophy"	ปรัชญา, [pǎt.ɲâː], pratya	ປັດຊະຍາ/Archaic ປັຊຍາ, [pát.sā.ɲáː], patsagna	ปรัชญา, [pràt.jāː], pratya
"eldest child"	ลูกกก, [lûːk kǒk], luk kok	ລູກກົກ, [lûːk kók], louk kôk	ลูกคนโต, [lûːk kʰōn tōː], luk khon to
"frangipani blossom"	ดอกจำปา, [dɔ̀ːk tɕàm.pàː], dok champa	ດອກຈຳປາ, [dɔ̏ːk tɕàm.pàː], dok champa	ดอกลั่นทม, [dɔ̀ːk lân.tʰōm], dok lanthom
"tomato"	บักเขือเทศ, [bǎk.kʰɯ̌a tʰêt], bakkheua thet	ໝາກເລັ່ນ, [mȁːk lēn], mak lén	มะเขือเทศ, [mā.kʰɯ̌a tʰêːt], makhuea thet
"much", "many"	หลาย, [lǎːj], lai	ຫຼາຍ, [lǎːj], lai	มาก, [mâːk], mak
"father-in-law"	พ่อเถ้า, [pʰɔ̄ː.tʰàw], phothao	ພໍ່ເຖົ້າ, [pʰɔ̄ː.tʰȁw], phothao	พ่อตา, [pʰɔ̂ː.tāː], phota
"to stop"	เซา, [sâw], sao	ເຊົາ, [sáw], xao	หยุด, [jùt], yut
"to like"	มัก, [màk], mak	ມັກ, [māk], mak	ชอบ, [tɕʰɔ̂ːp], chop
"good luck"	โซคดี, [sôːk dìː], sok di	ໂຊກດີ, [sôːk dìː], xôk di	โชคดี, [tɕʰôːk dīː], chok di
"delicious"	แซบ, [sɛ̂ːp], saep	ແຊບ, [sɛ̂ːp], xèp	อร่อย, [ʔā.rɔ̀j], aroi
"fun"	ม่วน, [mūan], muan	ມ່ວນ, [mūan], mouane	สนุก, [sā.nùk], sanuk
"really"	อีหลี, [ʔìː lǐː], i li****	ອີ່ຫຼີ, [ʔīː lǐː], i li	จริง*, [tɕīŋ], ching
"elegant"	โก้, [kôː], ko	ໂກ້, [kôː], kô	หรูหรา, [rǔː.rǎː], rura
"ox"	งัว, [ŋûa], ngua	ງົວ, [ŋúa], ngoua	วัว, [wūa], wua

- 1 Thai เท่าไหร่ is cognate to Lao ເທົ່າໃດ, thaodai, [tʰāw.dàj].
- 2 Thai แก้ว also exists as Lao ແກ້ວ,kèo [kɛ̑ːw], but has the meaning of "gem".
- 3 Thai ทำ also exists as Lao ທຳ, tham, [tʰám].
- 4 Lao ເຮືອນ also exists as formal Thai เรือน, ruean [rɯ̄an].
- 5 Thai บ้าน also exists as Lao ບ້ານ, bane, [bȃːn].
- 6 Thai จริง also exists as Lao ຈິງ, ching, [tɕìŋ].

== See also ==
- Comparison of Lao and Isan
