= Comparison of Lao and Isan =

Comparison of languages

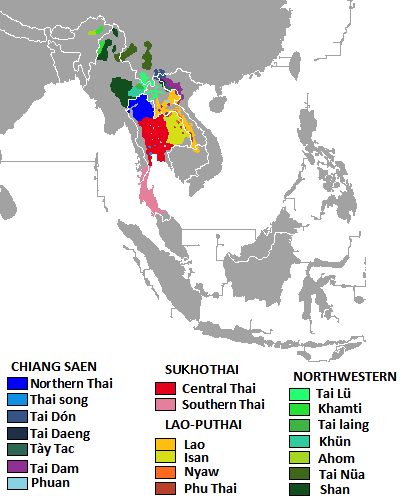
The Lao language (orange) and the Isan language (yellow).

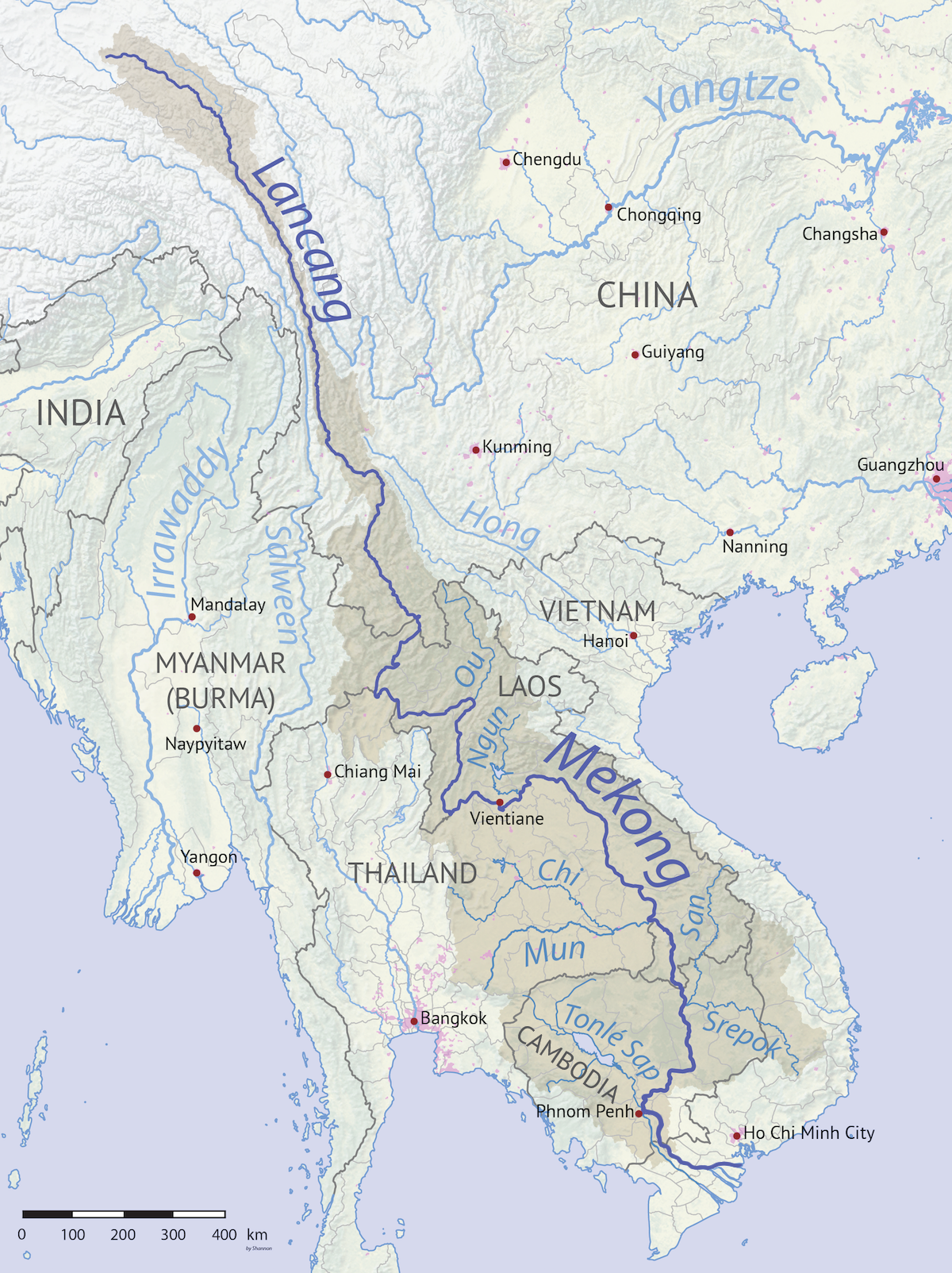
The Mekong river forms the border between the countries of Laos and Thailand, and the Lao and Isan languages.

Lao is a Tai language spoken by 7 million people in Laos and 23 million people in northeast Thailand. After the conclusion of the Franco-Siamese conflict of 1893, the Lao-speaking world was politically split at the Mekong River, with the left bank eventually becoming modern Laos and the right bank the Isan region of Thailand (formerly known as Siam prior to 1939). Isan refers to the local development of the Lao language in Thailand, as it diverged in isolation from Laos. The Isan language is still referred to as Lao by native speakers.

Isan houses the majority of Lao speakers and the affinity of shared culture with Laos is palpable in the food, architecture, music and language of the region. In its purest spoken form, the Isan language is basically the same as Lao spoken in Laos. Using just tone and some lexical items, there are at least twelve distinct speech varieties of Isan, most of which also continue across the Mekong River into Laos. In fact, the different speech varieties on roughly the same latitude tend to have more affinity with each other, despite the international border, than to speech varieties to the north and south. Only a handful of lexical items and grammatical differences exist that differentiate Isan as a whole, mainly as a result of more than a century of political separation between Isan and Laos, but most of these terms were introduced in the 1980s when Isan was better integrated into Thailand's transportation and communication infrastructure.

== Comparison of spelling and orthography ==
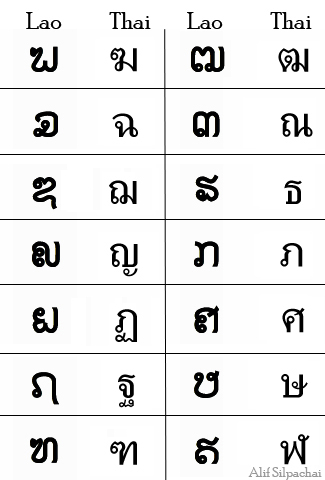
These now-obsolete Lao letters were once used to spell words of Pali and Sanskrit derivation, but were removed, reducing the consonant inventory and the similarity of spelling between Thai and Lao.

Isan and Lao have drifted away from each other mostly in terms of the written language. The Isan people were forced to abandon their traditional Tai Noi script and have come to use the Thai written language, or Isan written in the Thai script, for communication. In Laos, Tai Noi was modified into the modern Lao script, but several spelling changes in the language during the transition from the Lao monarchy to the communist rule moved Thai spelling and Lao spelling of cognate words further apart. Isan, writes all words with Thai cognates as they exist in Thai, with clusters, special letters only found in obscure Sanskrit words and etymological principles that preserve silent letters and numerous exceptions to Thai pronunciation rules although a small handful of Isan words, with no known or very obscure Thai cognates, are spelled more or less the same as they are in Lao.

Lao spelling in Laos was standardized in the opposite direction. Whilst previously written in a mixture of etymological and phonetical spellings, depending on the audience or author, the language underwent several reforms that moved the language towards a purely phonetical spelling. During the restoration of the king of Luang Phrabang as King of Laos under the last years of French rule in Laos, the government standardized the spelling of the Lao language, with movement towards a phonetical spelling with preservation of a semi-etymological spelling for Pali, Sanskrit and French loan words and the addition of archaic letters for words of Pali and Sanskrit origin concerning Indic culture and Buddhism.

Spelling reforms under the communist rule of Laos in 1975 were more radical, with the complete abolition of semi-etymological spelling in favor of phonetical spelling, with the removal of silent letters, removal of special letters for Indic loan words, all vowels being written out implicitly and even the elimination or replacement of the letter ຣ /r/ (but usually pronounced /l/) in official publications, although older people and many in the Lao diaspora continue to use some of the older spelling conventions. The examples demonstrate the differences between Lao and Isan, using Thai orthography, but also that between archaic and modern Lao, as well as the general pronunciation and spelling practices between Standard Thai and Standard Lao in general.

=== Silent letters ===
Numerous loan words from other languages, particularly Sanskrit and Pali, have numerous silent letters, sometimes even syllables, that are not pronounced in either Thai, Isan or Lao. In most cases, one of the final consonants in a word, or elsewhere in more recent loans from European languages, will have a special mark written over it (Thai ◌์ / Lao ◌໌), known in Isan as karan (การันต์) and Lao as karan/kalan (ກາລັນ/archaic ກາຣັນຕ໌ /kàː.lán/).

In reforms of the Lao language, these silent letters were removed from official spelling, moving the spelling of numerous loan words from etymological to phonetical. For instance, the homophones pronounced /tɕàn/ are all written in modern Lao as ຈັນ CH-^{A}-N, chan, but these were previously distinguished in writing as ຈັນທ໌ CH-^{A}-N-[TH] or ຈັນທຣ໌ CH-^{A}-N-[TH]-[R], 'moon'; ຈັນທ໌ CH-^{A}-N-[TH] or ຈັນທນ໌ CH-^{A}-N-[TH]-[N], 'sandalwood' and ຈັນ CH-^{A}-N, 'cruel.' In Isan, using Thai etymological spelling, the respective spellings are จันทร์ CH-^{A}-N-[TH]-[R], จันทน์ CH-^{A}-N-[TH]-[N] and จัน, CH-^{A}-N, with the latter being a shared Lao-Isan word with no Thai cognate.

=== Consonant clusters ===
The oldest texts in the Tai Noi corpus show that the earliest stages of the Lao language had consonant clusters in some native words as well as many loan words from Khmer, Mon, other Austroasiatic languages, Sanskrit and Pali. Although most of these were maintained in Thai pronunciation, these clusters were quickly abandoned, indicating that the Tai dialects that became the Lao language lacked them or that they lost them through separate language development. Unlike the Thai script, Lao preserves a subscript version of /l/ and /r/ ◌ຼ that was commonly used in the ancient Tai Noi script when these clusters were pronounced and written.

Some consonant clusters were maintained in the Lao language for some vocabulary, mostly of Sanskrit and Pali derivation and used in royalty or religious settings, but the most recent spelling reforms in the Lao language removed most of them. The Thai language has preserved all of them, and when Isan is written in Thai, cognates of Thai words are spelled as if they are pronounced in Thai, with consonant clusters that are usually not pronounced in Isan except some religious and technical terms.

=== Explicit gemination in Lao ===
As consonants may have one value at the start of a consonant and one at the end, occasionally the same letter will be used to end one syllable and begin the next. This remains common in many loan words from Sanskrit and Pali, and was once the case in Lao orthography, but now the different consonant sounds are written out explicitly and no longer implied from older and confusing rules of spelling. Thai, with its etymological spelling, preserves the implied pronunciation of these geminated consonant groupings.

=== Lao retention of Tai Noi vowel symbols ===
Lao uses two vowel symbols inherited from Tai Noi, one of which ◌ໍ or the nikkhahit (ນິກຄະຫິດ /nīk.kʰāʔ.hít/) is used to denote the vowel /ɔː/ in open syllables where that is the final sound in the syllable and the other ◌ົ or mai kon (ໄມ້ກົງ /mȃj kòŋ/) which is used to denote the vowel /o/, both of which are sometimes implied in Thai orthography. The latter symbol is also used with some vowels with various meanings. The viram (Archaic ວິຣາມ/ວິລາມ /wīʔ.láːm/) was formerly used as a variant of Lao letter ຍ in a word as well as several other uses.

=== Lao simplification of terminal consonants ===
Both Thai, Lao and Isan only permit the final consonants /k/, /ŋ/, /t/, /n/, /p/, and /m/, with many letters beginning a syllable with one sound and ending a syllable or word with another. Spelling reforms in Laos restricted the final consonants to be spelled ກ, ງ, ດ, ນ, ບ and ມ which correspond to Thai letters ก, ง, ด, น, บ and ม, respectively. As Thai has retained these final consonants according to etymology, this has further moved Lao spelling from Thai and Isan written in Thai in a large number of common words.

=== Lao vowel reduction ===
The archaic vowels ◌ັຽ and ◌ັມ were replaced with existing vowels ໄ and ຳ as these pairs both represented /aj/ and /am/, respectively. The Lao vowel ໄ◌ຽ was also replaced by ໄ.

=== Lao explicit vowels ===
In the abugida systems, open syllables are assumed to have /a/ or /aʔ/ following them. Modern Lao spelling requires that all vowels are written out, altering the spelling of numerous words and furthering the language from Thai. As this can alter the tone of the words, sometimes tone marks or silent /h/ are used to either represent the actual pronunciation of the word or restore it to its original pronunciation.

=== Lao ligatures ===
Lao uses a silent letter ຫ /h/ in front of consonants ງ /ŋ/, ຍ /ɲ/, ນ /n/, ມ /m/, ລ /l/, ຣ /r/ or /l/ and ວ /w/ to move these consonants into the high tone class, used to alter the tone of a word. This is analogous to the use of ห /h/ before the equivalent ง /ŋ/, ย /j/ (but in Isan, it sometimes represents /ɲ/ and also ญ, which is /j/ in Central and Southern Thai and represents /ŋ/ in Isan), น /n/, ม /m/, ล /l/, ร /r/ (generally /l/ when in a digraph in Isan) and ว /w/ (generally both /ʋ/ and /w/ in Isan).

As a legacy of the Tai Noi script, Lao writers can use the special ligature ໜ HN instead or, when typesetting or rendering unavailable, it can be optionally be written ຫນ H-N as well as ໝ HM and modern alternative ຫມ. Both ຫລ H-L and ຫຣ H-R have the same ligature form ຫຼ H_{L/R}. Previous versions of the script also had special ligatures ພຽ PHY (ພ + ຍ /pʰj/) and ຫຽ HY (ຫ + ຍ /hj/) with the latter replaced by ຫຍ HY /j/ (high class tone). Former ligatures such as SN and ML have disappeared or were split into syllables as consonant clusters were generally lost or replaced. For example, Archaic Lao ສນອງ SN-O-NG and ມຼາບຼີ M_{L}-A-B_{R}-^{I} have become in the modern language ສະໜອງ S-A-N-O-NG sanong /sáʔ.nɔ̌ːŋ/, 'message' (derived from Khmer snaang ស្នង /snɑːŋ/) and ມະລາບີ M-A-L-A-B-^{I} malabi /māʔ.láː.bìː/, approximation of endonym of the Mlabri people. Thai orthography preserves writing the consonants together, although in the modern Thai language these consonants are separated by a vowel according to the current pronunciation rules.

Both Tai Noi and the current Lao alphabet lack equivalents to the Thai vowel ligatures ฤ, ฤๅ, ฦ and ฦๅ, and are mainly used to represent the sounds /rɯ/ or /ri/, /rɯː/, /lɯ/ and /lɯː/, respectively, although the latter two symbols are obsolete in modern Thai. These symbols were used to represent loanwords from Sanskrit ऋ /r̩/, ॠ /r̩ː/, ऌ /l̩/ and ॡ /l̩ː/, respectively, but the 2nd and 3rd are rare sounds in Sanskrit; last one doesn't occur in Sanskrit and is only there to match the short-long pairs.

== Typographical differences ==
Traditionally, no punctuation exists in either Thai or Lao orthographies, with spaces used to separate lists, sentences and clauses, but otherwise words are written with no spaces between them. A few symbols include the cancellation mark ◌໌ used to mark letters in loan words that are not pronounced, the repetition symbol ໆ used to indicate words or phrases are to be repeated, an ellipsis-like symbol ຯ used to shorten lengthy phrases, such as royal titles or to indicate that following portions have been removed and the equivalent to the et cetera symbol ຯລຯ. These all have equivalents in the Thai script as ◌์, ๆ, ฯ and ฯลฯ.

Other Thai script symbols, such as ๏, used for marking the beginning of texts, lines or stanzas, ๛ to mark the end of chapters, ฯะ to mark the end of stanzas and ๚ to mark the end of sections. These symbols could be combined to provide meaning. A similar system was in use in Laos but was later abolished. The system is mostly archaic in Thai texts, but is still taught as many old texts feature these symbols.

The Lao script only uses two of the tone marks ◌່ and ◌້, although ◌໊ and ◌໋ may occasionally be used to record idiosyncratic or emotional speech, as aids to capture tones of different dialects or onomatopoeia. In the Thai script, the equivalent tone marks are ◌่, ◌้, ◌๊ and ◌๋, respectively.

In modern writing, Thai and Lao orthographies have both adopted the question mark "?", exclamation point "!", comma "", parentheses "()", hyphen "-", ellipsis "...", and period "." from their respective English and French sources. Since Isan adopted the Thai punctuation via English, the quotation marks """" are used instead of guillemets, "«»", and spaces are not inserted before terminal punctuation marks. Although Lao speakers in Laos will often use French-style punctuation, English-style punctuation is increasingly becoming more commonplace there.

== Grammatical differences ==
=== Formal language ===
Since the use of Central Thai is deemed polite and mandatory in official and formal settings, Isan speakers will often use the Thai ครับ, khrap (/kʰráp/), used by males, and ค่ะ, kha (/kʰâʔ/), used by females, sometimes in place of or after the ones shared with Lao. Isan speakers, however, do not use the very formal particle ข้าน้อย, kha noi (/kʰàː nɔ̏ːj/, cf. Lao: ຂ້ານ້ອຍ/archaic ຂ້ານ້ຽ) at the end of sentences. Also, the use of เจ้า, chao (/tɕâw/, cf. Lao: ເຈົ້າ) and formal โดย, doy (/dòːj/, cf. Lao: ໂດຍ/archaic ໂດຽ, doi), to mark the affirmative or "yes" is no longer used in Isan, instead this is replaced with the general ending particles or the equivalent Thai expression.

=== Word order ===
A very few compounds in Lao are left-branching, but most of the time they are right-branching, as they are almost always in Thai and Isan.

- Isan หมูส้ม mu som (/mǔː sòm/, but Lao ສົ້ມໝູ/ສົ້ມຫມູ som mou, "sour pork", (/sȍm mŭː/. Cf. Thai หมูแหนม, mu naem (/mŭː nɛ̌ːm/).
- Isan ไก่ปิ้ง kai ping (/káj pîŋ/), but Lao ປີ້ງໄກ່, ping kai, "barbecued chicken", (/pȋːŋ káj/). Cf. Thai ไก่ย่าง, kai yang (/kàj jâːŋ/).

== Lexical comparison ==
Lao and Isan share most of their vocabulary, tone, and grammatical features. Technical, academic, and scientific language, and different sources for loan words have diverged the speech to an extent. Isan has borrowed most of its vocabulary from Thai, including numerous English and Chinese (Min Nan) loan words that are commonly used in Thai. Lao, on the other hand, has influences from French and Vietnamese that come from the establishment of the Protectorate of Laos and its inclusion in French Indochina. In ordinary and casual speech, only a few lexical items separate Isan and Lao, and many dialects do not end at the border.

=== Thai loanwords ===
The main thing that differentiates Isan from Lao is the use of numerous Thai words. The process accelerated with greater integration of Isan into Thai political control in the early 20th century. Thai words make up the bulk of scientific, technical, governmental, political, academic, and slang vocabularies that have been adopted in Isan. Many words used in Isan have become obsolete, such as the use of ขัว, khua (/kʰŭa/) and น้ำก้อน, nam kon (/nâm kɔ̑ːn/), which exist in Laos as ຂົວ and ນ້ຳກ້ອນ, but replaced by Thai forms สะพาน, saphan (/sȁʔ.pʰâːn/), and น้ำแข็ง (/nȁm kʰɛ̌ŋ/), nam khaeng, respectively. Thai, Isan, and Lao share vocabulary, but sometimes this can vary in frequency. For instance, Lao speakers use ສະພານ, saphan, as a more formal word for "bridge". The very formal Thai word for "house", เรือน, reuan (/rɯan/) is cognate to the common Isan เฮือน, heuan, and Lao ເຮືອນ, huean (/hɯ́an/). Although many Lao speakers can understand and speak Thai due to exposure to Thai publications and media, the official status of the language in Laos, pressure to preserve the Lao language, and unique neologisms and other influences differentiate the language from Thai. A few neologisms in Laos are unique coinages.

Thai loanwords
English	Isan	*Non-Existent Isan	Lao	Thai
"politburo"	โปลิตบูโร, [pòː.lìt.bùː.lôː], politburo	*กรมการเมือง, *[kòm kàːn mɯ̂aŋ], *krom kan mueang	ກົມການເມືອງ, [kòm kàːn mɯ́aŋ], kom kan muang	โปลิตบูโร, [pōː.lít.būː.rōː], politburo
"washing machine"	เครื่องซักผ้า, [kʰɯ̄aŋ sàk pʰàː], khrueang sak pha	*จักซักเครื่อง, *[tɕǎk sàk kʰɯ̄aŋ], *chak sak khrueang	ຈັກຊັກເຄື່ອງ, [tɕák sāk kʰɯ̄aŋ], chak xak khuang	เครื่องซักผ้า*, [kʰrɯ̂aŋ sák pʰâː], khrueang sak pha
"aeroplane", "airplane" (US)	เครื่องบิน, [kʰɯ̄aŋ bìn], khrueang bin	*เฮือบิน, *[hɯ̂a bìn], *huea bin,	ເຮືອບິນ, [hɯ́a bìn], hua bin	เครื่องบิน, [kʰrɯ̂aŋ bīn], khrueang bin
"provincial sub-district"	ตำบล, tambon, [tàm.bòn]	*ตาแสง, *[tàː sɛ̆ːŋ], *ta saeng	ຕາແສງ, tasèng, [tàː.sɛ̆ːŋ]	ตำบล, tambon, [tām.bōn]

=== French loanwords ===
After the division of the Lao-speaking world in 1893, French would serve as the administrative language of the French Protectorate of Laos, carved from the Lao lands of the left bank, for sixty years until 1953 when Laos achieved full independence. The close relationship of the Lao monarchy with France continued the promotion and spread of French until the end of the Laotian Civil War when the monarchy was removed and the privileged position of French began its decline. Many of the initial borrowings for terms from Western culture were imported via French, as opposed to Isan which derived them from English via Thai. For instance, Isan speakers use sentimet (Northeastern Thai: เซนติเมตร /sên.tǐʔ.méːt/) in approximation of English 'centimeter' (/sɛn tɪ miː tə/) whereas Lao uses xangtimèt (Lao: ຊັງຕີແມດ /sáŋ.tìː.mɛ́ːt/) in approximation of French centimètre (/sɑ̃ ti mɛtʀ/). Lao people also tend to use French forms of geographic place names, thus the Republic of Guinea is kini (Northeastern Thai: /กินี/ /kǐʔ.nîː/) via Thai based on English 'Guinea' (/gi niː/) as opposed to kiné (Lao: /ກີເນ/ /kìː.néː/) from French Guinée (/gi ne/).

Laos maintains the French-language weekly Le Rénovateur, but French-language content is sometimes seen alongside English in publications in older issues of Khaosane Phathét Lao News and sporadically on television ad radio. French still appears on signage, is the language of major civil engineering projects and is the language of the élite, especially the older generations that received secondary and tertiary education in French-medium schools or studied in France. France maintains a large Lao diaspora and some of the very well-to-do still send their children to France for study. The result of this long-standing French influence is the use of hundreds of loan words of French origin in the Lao language of Laos—although many are old-fashioned and somewhat obsolete or co-exist alongside more predominate native usages—that are unfamiliar to most Isan speakers since the incorporation of the right bank into Siam prevented French influence.

French loanwords
Isan		Thai		Lao		French		Lao alternate	Gloss
เนกไท nek thai	[nê(ː)k tʰâj, -tʰáj]	เนกไท nek thai	[nê(ː)k tʰāj, -tʰáj]	ກາລະວັດ/ກາຣະວັດ karavat (*การะวัด)	[kàː.lā.wāt]	cravate	/kʀa vat/		'necktie'
โฮงภาพยนตร์ hong phapphayon	[hôːŋ pʰȃːp.pʰā.ɲôn]	โรงภาพยนตร์ rong phapphayon	[rōːŋ pʰȃːp.pʰā.jōn]	ໂຮງຊີເນມາ hông xinéma (*โฮงซีเนมา)	[hóːŋ sī(ː).nɛ́ː.máː]	cinéma	/si ne ma/	ໂຮງຫນັງ/ໂຮງໜັງ hông nang	'cinema', 'movie theater' (US)
พจนานุกรม photchananukrom	[pʰòt.tɕā.nâː.nù(ʔ).kòm]	พจนานุกรม photchananukrom	[pʰót.tɕā.nāː.nú(ʔ).krōm]	ດີຊອນແນ/ດີຊອນແນຣ໌ dixonnè (*ดิซอนแนร์)	[dì(ː).sɔ́ːn.nɛ́ː]	dictionnaire	/dik sjɔ nɛʀ/	ພົດຈະນານຸກົມ phôtchananoukôm	'dictionary'
แอฟริกา aepfrika	[ʔɛ́(ː)p.fì(ʔ).kàː]	แอฟริกา aepfrika	[ʔɛ́(ː)p.frí(ʔ).kāː]	ອາຟິກ/ອາຟຣິກ afik/afrik (*อาฟริก)	[ʔàː.fīk, -frīk]	Afrique	/a fʀik/	ອາຟິກາ/ອາຟຣິກາ afika/afrika	'Africa'
บักแอปเปิล bak aeppoen	[bǎk ʔɛ́p.pɤ̂n]	ผลแอปเปิล phon aeppoen	[pʰǒn ʔɛ́p.pɤ̂n]	ຫມາກປົ່ມ/ໝາກປົ່ມ mak pôm (*หมากป่ม)	[mȁːk pōm]	pomme	/pɔm/	ຫມາກໂປມ/ໝາກໂປມ (*หมากโปม)	'apple'
เนย noei	[nɤ̂ːj]	เนย noei	[nɤ̄ːj]	ເບີ/ເບີຣ໌ bue (*เบอร์)	[bɤ̀ː]	beurre	/bœʀ/		'butter'
ไวน์ wai	[wâːj]	ไวน์ wai	[wāːj]	ແວງ vèng (*แวง)	[wɛ́ːŋ]	vin	/vɛ̃/		'wine'
คนส่งไปรษณีย์ khon song praisani	[kʰôn sōŋ pàj.sā.nîː]	คนส่งไปรษณีย์ khon song praisani	[kʰōn sòŋ prāj.sā.nīː]	ຟັກເຕີ/ຟັກເຕີຣ໌ fakteu (*ฟักเตอร์)	[fāk tɤ̀ː]	facteur	/fak tœʀ/	ຄົນສົ່ງໜັງສື khôn song nangsue (*ฟักเตอร์)	'postman', 'mailman' (US)
ปลาวาฬ pla wan	[pàː wâːn]	ปลาวาฬ pla wan	[plāː wāːn]	ປາບາແລນ pa balèn (*ปลาบาแลน)	[pàː bàː.lɛ́ːn]	baleine	/ba lɛn/		'whale'
เคมี khemi	[kʰêː.mîː]	เคมี khemi	[kʰēː.mīː]	ຊີມີ ximi (*ชีมี)	[síː.míː]	chimie	/ʃi mi/	ເຄມີ khémi	'chemistry'
บิลเลียด binliat	[bìn.lîat]	บิลเลียด binliat	[bīn.lîat]	ບີຢາ biya (*บียา)	[bìː.jàː]	billard	/bi jaʀ/	ບິລລຽດ binliat	'billiards'
ธนาณัติ thananat	[tʰā.nâː.nàt]	ธนาณัติ thananat	[tʰā.nāː.nát]	ມັງດາ mangda (*มังดา)	[máŋ.dàː]	mandat	/mɑ̃ dɑ/	ທະນານັດ thananat	'money order'
กรัม kram	[kàm]	กรัม kram	[krām]	ກາມ/ກຣາມ kam/kram (*กราม)	[kàːm, -kràːm]	gramme	/gʀɑ̃m/	ກະລາມ (*กะลาม)	'gramme', 'gram'

=== Vietnamese loanwords ===
As a result of Vietnamese immigration and influence, a handful of lexical items have been borrowed directly from Vietnamese, most of which are not used in Isan, although 'to work' or wiak (Northeastern Thai: เวียก /wȋak/) has spread into Isan from Lao viak (Lao: ວຽກ) from Vietnamese việc (/viə̯k/). Vietnamese Laotians comprise roughly 79,000 people in Laos today, roughly three times the number of Vietnamese people in Isan, and operate local schools and community associations in the major cities, although many of the Vietnamese Isan people are descendants of Vietnamese that fled Laos during the Laotian Civil War and many of their descendants have assimilated to the local language. The Vietnamese have little cultural impact in Isan, and thus aside from wiak, most Vietnamese terms borrowed in Lao are not used in Isan. The opening of Laos in the 1990s has significantly reduced the presence of the Vietnamese military and technical assistance.

Vietnamese loanwords
Isan		Thai		Lao		Vietnamese		Lao alternate	Gloss
ก๋วยเตี๋ยว kuaitiao	[kǔaj.tǐaw]	ก๋วยเตี๋ยว kuaitiao	[kǔaj.tǐaw]	ເຝີ feu	[fɤ̌ː]	phở	/fə ̉ː/	ກ໋ວຍຕຽວ kouay tio	'Chinese-style noodle soup'
เยื้อน yuean	[ɲɯ̏an]	งดเว้น ngot wen	[ŋót wén]	ກຽງ kiang	[kìaŋ]	kiêng	/kiə̯ŋ/	ເຍຶ້ອນ gnuan	'to abstain', 'to refrain'
ฉาก chak	[sàːk]	ฉาก chak	[tɕʰàːk]	ອີແກ້ i kè	[ʔìː kɛ̂ː]	ê-ke (Note: Itself a loan word from French équerre)	/e kɛ/	ສາກ sak	'carpenter's square', 'T-square'
เฮ็ดงาน het ngan	[hèt ŋâːn]	ทำงาน tham ngan	[tʰām ŋāːn]	ເຮັດວຽກ het viak	[hēt wîak]	việc (Note: Lao ເຮັດ, to do + Vietnamese việc, to work, /viək/ (ວຽກ).)	/viə̯̣k/	ເຮັດງານ hét ngan	'to work', 'to labour'

=== Vocabulary unique to Isan ===
A small handful of lexical items are unique to Isan and not commonly found in standard Lao, but may exist in other Lao dialects. Some of these words exist alongside more typically Lao or Thai usages.

Unique to Lao in Isan
English	Isan	*Non-Existent Lao	Lao	Thai	Isan Variant
'to be well'	ซำบาย, [sâm.bàːj], sambai	*ຊຳບາຍ, *[sám.bàːj], *xambai	ສະບາຍ/Archaic ສະບາຽ, [sā.bàːj], sabai	สบาย, [sā.bāːj], sabai	สบาย, [sā.bàːj], sabai
'fruit'	บัก, [bǎk], bak	*ບັກ, *[bák], *bak,	ໝາກ/ຫມາກ, [mȁːk], mak	ผล, [pʰŏn], phon	หมาก, [màːk], mak
'lunch'	ข้าวสวย, [kʰà(ː)w sǔaj], khao suai	*ເຂົ້າສວຍ, *[kʰȁ(ː)w sǔaj], *khao souay	ອາຫານທ່ຽງ, [ʔàː.hǎːn tʰīaŋ], ahane thiang	อาหารกลางวัน, [ʔāː.hăːn klāːŋ.wān], ahan klangwan	ข้าวเที่ยง, [kʰà(ː)w tʰīaŋ], khao thiang
'traditional animist ceremony'	บายศรี, [bàːj sǐː], bai si	*ບາຍສີ, *[bàːj sǐː], *bai si	ບາສີ, bàː.sĭː], basi	บวงสรวง, [būaŋ sǔaŋ], buang suang	บายศรีสู่ขวัญ, [bàːj.sǐː sūː kʰwǎn], baisi su khwan
'ice cream'	ไอติม, [ʔàj.tìm], aitim	*ໄອຕິມ, *[ʔàj.tìm], *aitim	ກາແລ້ມ, [kàː.lɛ̂ːm], kalèm	ไอศกรีม, [ʔāj.sā.krīːm], aisakrim	N/A

=== Other lexical differences ===
Comparison of Lao and Isan
English	Isan	IPA	Lao	IPA	Thai	IPA
'ice'	น้ำแข็ง	[nȁm.kʰɛ̌ŋ], namkhaeng	ນ້ຳກ້ອນ*	[nȃm.kɔ̑ːn], namkone	น้ำแข็ง*	[nám.kʰɛ̌ŋ], namkhaeng
'bridge'	สะพาน	[sā.pʰâːn], saphan	ຂົວ*	[kʰǔa], khoua	สะพาน*	[sā.pʰāːn], saphan
'window'	หน้าต่าง	[nàː.táːŋ], natang	ປ່ອງຢ້ຽມ	[pɔ̄ŋ.jîam], pongyiam	หน้าต่าง*	[nâː.tàːŋ], natang
'paper'	กระดาษ	[kā.dàːt], kradat	ເຈ້ຍ/Archaic ເຈັ້ຽ	[tɕîa], chia	กระดาษ*	[krā.dàːt], kradat
'book'	หนังสือ	[năŋ.sɯ̌ː], nangsue	ປຶ້ມ	[pɯ̂m], peum	หนังสือ*	[năŋ.sɯ̌ː], nangsue
'January'	มกราคม	[mòk.kā.lâː.kʰôm], mokkharakhom	ມັງກອນ*	[máŋ.kɔ̀ːn], mangkone	มกราคม*	[mók.kā.rāː.kʰōm], mokkarakhom
'province'	จังหวัด	[tɕàŋ.wȁt], changwat	ແຂວງ*	[kʰwɛ̌ːŋ], khwèng	จังหวัด	[tɕāŋ.wàt], changwat
'plain' (adj.)	เปล่า	[páːw], plaw	ລ້າ	[lâː], la	เปล่า	[plàːw], plao
'motorcycle'	มอเตอร์ไซค์	[mɔ̂ː.tɤ̄ː.sâj], motoesai	ລົດຈັກ/Archaic ຣົຖຈັກ	[lōt.tɕák], lot chak	มอเตอร์ไซค์*	[mɔ̄ː.tɤ̄ː.sāj], motoesai
'citronella grass', 'lemongrass'	หัวสิงไค	[hǔa sǐŋ.kʰâj], hua singkhai	ຫົວສິງໄຄ	[hŭa sĭŋ.kʰáj], houa singkhai	ตะไคร้	[tā.kʰráj], takhrai
'papaya'	บักหุ่ง*	[bǎk hūŋ], bak hung	ໝາກຫຸ່ງ/ຫມາກຫຸ່ງ	[mȁːk hūŋ], mak houng	มะละกอ*	[máʔ.láʔ.kɔ̄ː], malako

- 1 Lao ນ້ຳກ້ອນ formerly existed as Isan น้ำก้อน, nam kon (/nâm kɔ̂ːn/), but usage now obsolete.
- 2 Thai and Isan น้ำแข็ง also exists as Lao ນ້ຳແຂງ, nam khèng ([nȃm kʰɛ̆ːŋ]).
- 3 Lao ຂົວ formerly existed as Isan ขัว, khua (/kʰŭa/), but usage now obsolete.
- 4 Thai and Isan สะพาน also exists as formal Lao ສະພານ, saphane (/sáʔ.pʰáːn/).
- 5 Thai and Isan หน้าต่าง also exists as Lao ຫນ້າຕ່າງ/ໜ້າຕ່າງ, natang (/nàː.táːŋ/).
- 6 Thai and Isan กระดาษ also exists as Lao ກະດາດ/Archaic ກະດາສ, kadat (/káʔ.dàːt/).
- 7 Thai and Isan หนังสือ also exists as Lao ໜັງສື/ຫນັງສື, nangsue (/năŋ sɯ̌ː/).
- 8 Lao ມັງກອນ also exists as Isan มังกร, mangkon (/máŋ kɔ̀ːn/), referring to the dragon but not the month named after it.
- 9 Thai and Isan มกราคม also exists as Lao ມົກກະລາຄົມ/Archaic ມົກກະຣາຄົມ, môkkarakhôm (/mōk.káʔ.láː.kʰóm/).
- 10 Lao ແຂວງ also exists as Thai and Isan แขวง, khwaeng (/kʰwɛ̌ːŋ/), when referring to provinces of Laos.
- 11 Thai and Isan จังหวัด exist as Lao ຈັງຫວັດ, changvat (/tɕàŋ wát/), when referring to provinces of Thailand.
- 12 Thai and Isan variant of มอเตอร์ไซค์, รถจักรยานยนต์, rot chakkrayanyon (/rót tɕàk.kràʔ.jaːn.jon/), similar to Lao ລົດຈັກ[ກະຍານ]/Archaic ຣົຖຈັກຍານ, lôt chak[kagnane] (/lōt tɕák [káʔ ɲáːn]/).
- 13 Isan บัก is a local variant of Isan หมาก and Lao ໝາກ/ຫມາກ, mak (/mȁːk/).
- 14 The มะ in Thai มะละกอ is cognate to Isan หมาก and Lao ໝາກ/ຫມາກ, mak (/mȁːk/).

== See also ==
- Comparison of Lao and Thai
